= Roman art =

Art made in Ancient Rome and the territories it ruled

Roman art
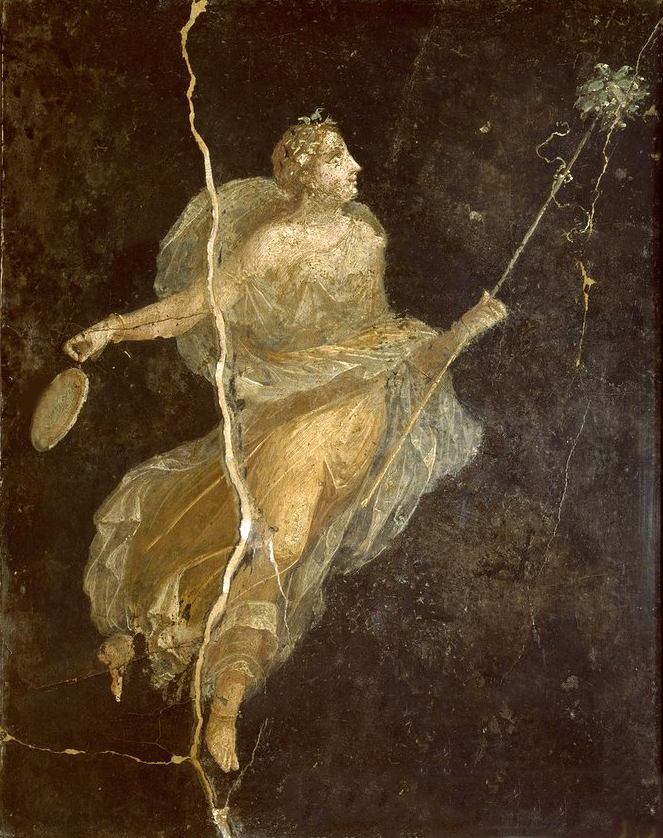
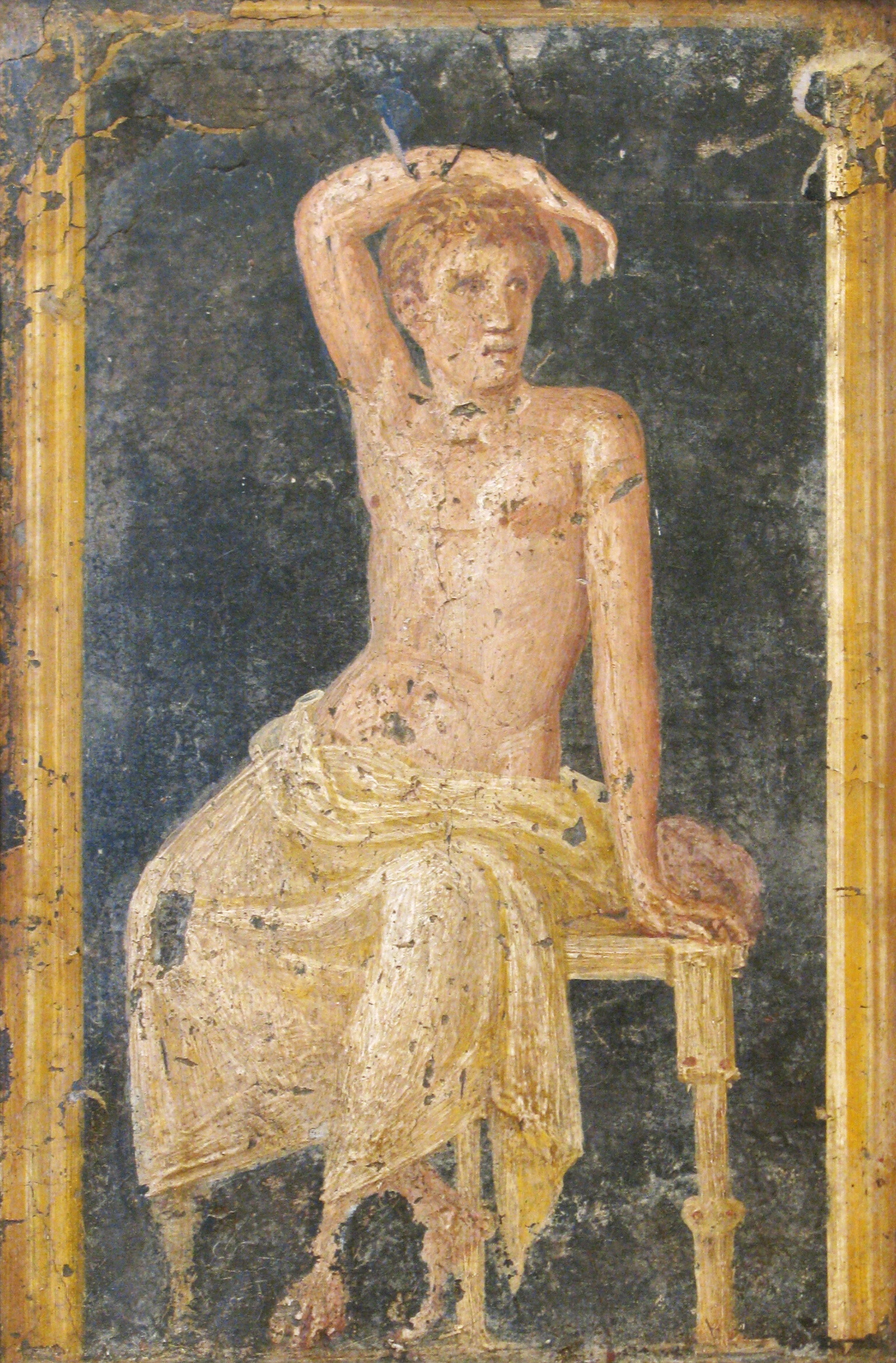
Left image: A Roman fresco from Pompeii showing a Maenad in silk dress, 1st century AD
Right image: A fresco of a young man from the Villa di Arianna, Stabiae, 1st century AD

The art of Ancient Rome, and the territories of its Republic and later Empire, includes architecture, painting, sculpture and mosaic work. Luxury objects in metal-work, gem engraving, ivory carvings, and glass are sometimes considered to be minor forms of Roman art, although they were not considered as such at the time. Sculpture was perhaps considered as the highest form of art by Romans, but figure painting was also highly regarded. A very large body of sculpture has survived from about the 1st century BC onward, though very little from before, but very little painting remains, and probably nothing that a contemporary would have considered to be of the highest quality.

Ancient Roman pottery was not a luxury product, but a vast production of "fine wares" in terra sigillata were decorated with reliefs that reflected the latest taste, and provided a large group in society with stylish objects at what was evidently an affordable price. Roman coins were an important means of propaganda, and have survived in enormous numbers.

== Introduction ==
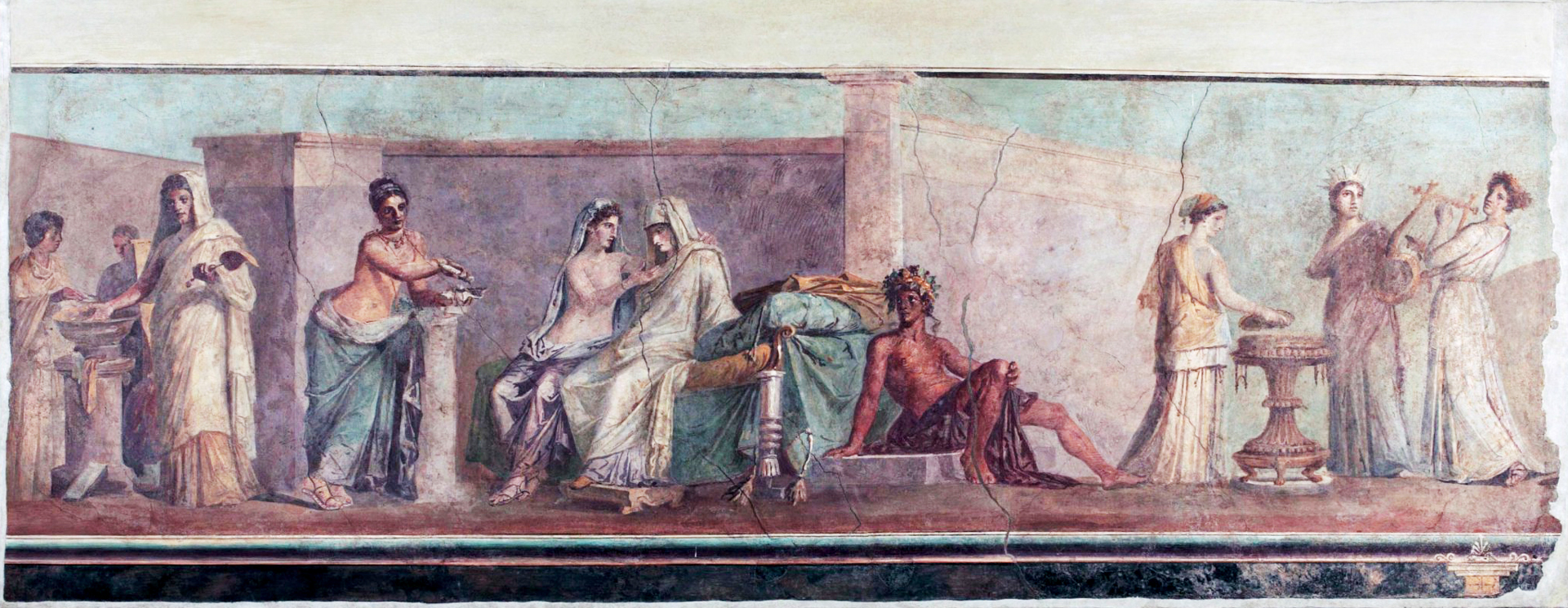
A fresco depicting wedding. In the center, a young bride is comforted and supported by Venus. 1st century BC, Rome

While the traditional view of the ancient Roman artists is that they often borrowed from, and copied Greek precedents (much of the Greek sculptures known today are in the form of Roman marble copies), more of recent analysis has indicated that Roman art is a highly creative pastiche relying heavily on Greek models but also encompassing Etruscan, native Italic, and even Egyptian visual culture. Stylistic eclecticism and practical application are the hallmarks of much Roman art.

Pliny, Ancient Rome's most important historian concerning the arts, recorded that nearly all the forms of art – sculpture, landscape, portrait painting, even genre painting – were advanced in Greek times, and in some cases, more advanced than in Rome. Though very little remains of Greek wall art and portraiture, certainly Greek sculpture and vase painting bears this out. These forms were not likely surpassed by Roman artists in fineness of design or execution. As another example of the lost "Golden Age", he singled out Peiraikos, "whose artistry is surpassed by only a very few ... He painted barbershops and shoemakers' stalls, donkeys, vegetables, and such, and for that reason came to be called the 'painter of vulgar subjects'; yet these works are altogether delightful, and they were sold at higher prices than the greatest paintings of many other artists." The adjective "vulgar" is used here in its original definition, which means "common".

The Greek antecedents of Roman art were legendary. In the mid-5th century BC, the most famous Greek artists were Polygnotos, noted for his wall murals, and Apollodoros, the originator of chiaroscuro. The development of realistic technique is credited to Zeuxis and Parrhasius, who according to ancient Greek legend, are said to have once competed in a bravura display of their talents, history's earliest descriptions of trompe-l'œil painting. In sculpture, Skopas, Praxiteles, Phidias, and Lysippos were the foremost sculptors. It appears that Roman artists had much Ancient Greek art to copy from, as trade in art was brisk throughout the empire, and much of the Greek artistic heritage found its way into Roman art through books and teaching. Ancient Greek treatises on the arts are known to have existed in Roman times, though are now lost. Many Roman artists came from Greek colonies and provinces.

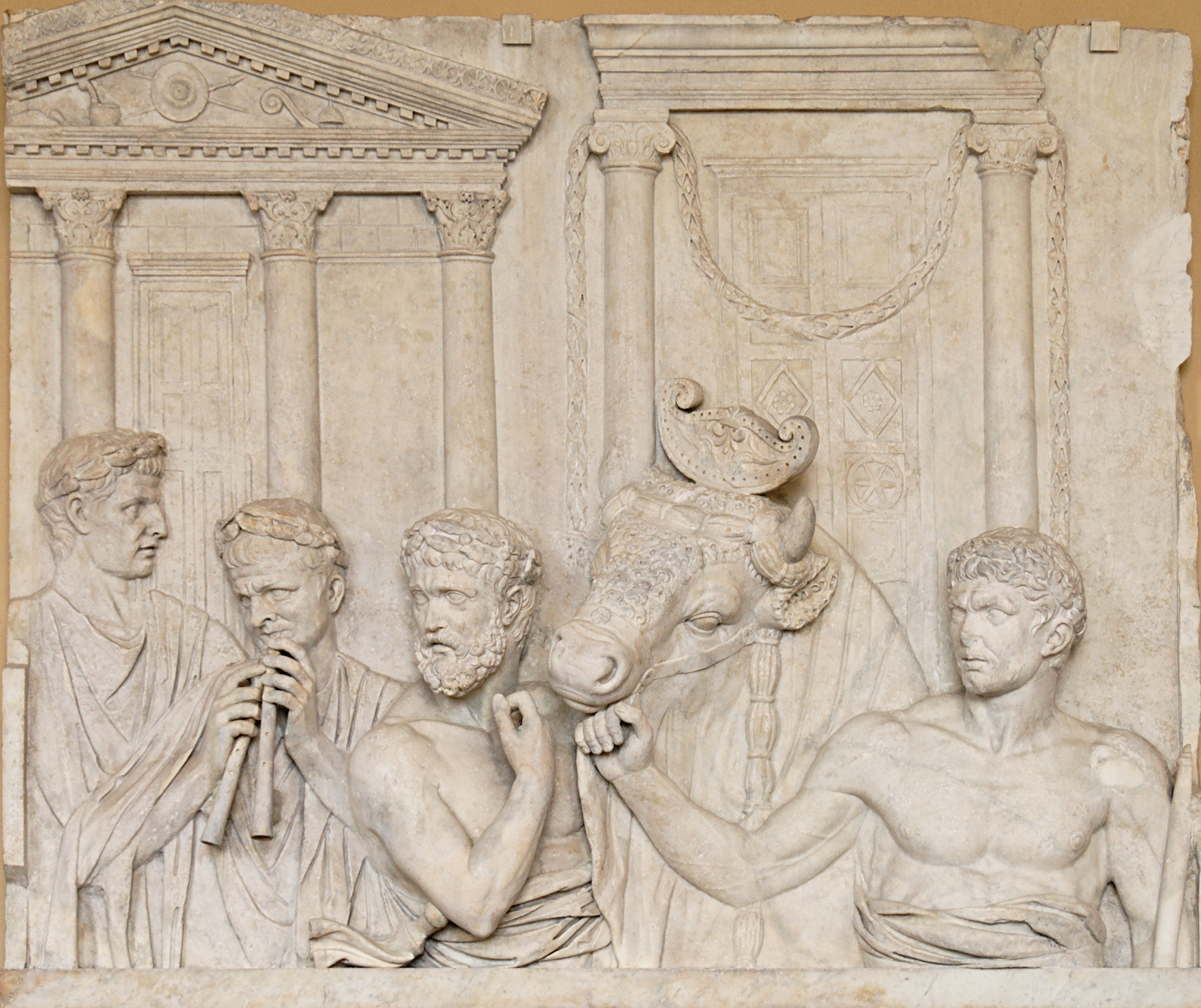
Preparation of an animal sacrifice; marble, fragment of an architectural relief, first quarter of the 2nd century AD; from Rome, Italy

The high number of Roman copies of Greek art also speaks of the esteem Roman artists had for Greek art, and perhaps of its rarer and higher quality. Many of the art forms and methods used by the Romans – such as high and low relief, free-standing sculpture, bronze casting, vase art, mosaic, cameo, coin art, fine jewelry and metalwork, funerary sculpture, perspective drawing, caricature, genre and portrait painting, landscape painting, architectural sculpture, and trompe-l'œil painting – all were developed or refined by Ancient Greek artists. One exception is the Roman bust, which did not include the shoulders. The traditional head-and-shoulders bust may have been an Etruscan or early Roman form. Virtually every artistic technique and method used by Renaissance artists 1,900 years later had been demonstrated by Ancient Greek artists, with the notable exceptions of oil colors and mathematically accurate perspective. Where Greek artists were highly revered in their society, most Roman artists were anonymous and considered tradesmen. There is no recording, as in Ancient Greece, of the great masters of Roman art, and practically no signed works. Where Greeks worshipped the aesthetic qualities of great art, and wrote extensively on artistic theory, Roman art was more decorative and indicative of status and wealth, and apparently not the subject of scholars or philosophers.

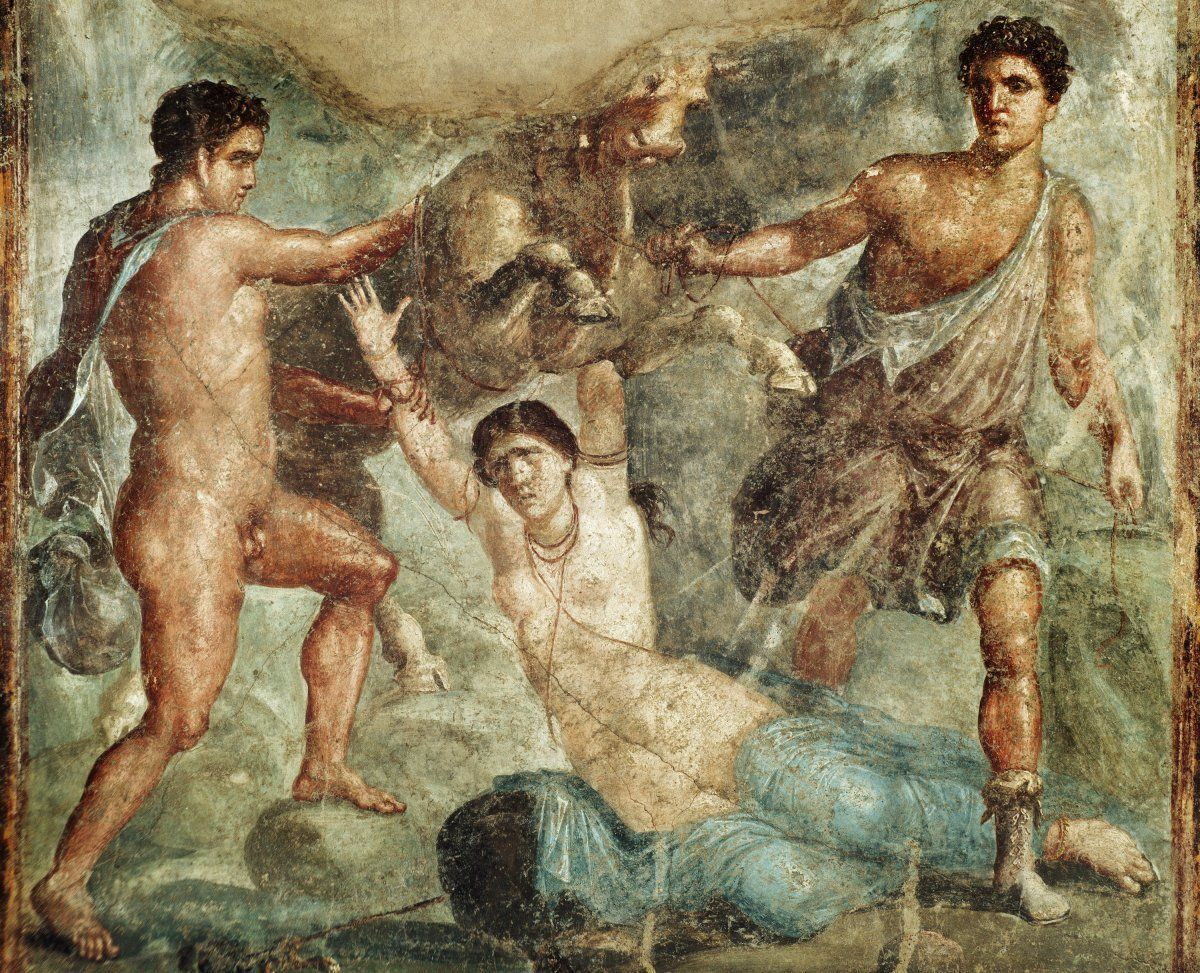
A Roman fresco depicting Amphion and Zethus subject Dirce to the bull (from the House of the Vettii, Pompeii)

Partly because Roman cities were mostly far larger than the Greek city-states in population, and generally less provincial, art in Ancient Rome took on a wider, and sometimes more utilitarian, purpose. Roman culture assimilated many cultures and was for the most part tolerant of the ways of conquered peoples. Roman art was commissioned, displayed, and owned in far greater quantities, and adapted to more uses than in Greek times. Wealthy Romans were more materialistic; they decorated their walls with art, their home with decorative objects, and themselves with fine jewelry.

In the Christian era of the late Empire, from 350 to 500 AD, wall painting, mosaic ceiling and floor work, and funerary sculpture thrived, while full-sized sculpture in the round and panel painting died out, most likely for religious reasons. When Constantine moved the capital of the empire to Byzantium (renamed Constantinople), Roman art incorporated Eastern influences to produce the Byzantine style of the late empire. When Rome was sacked in the 5th century, artisans moved to and found work in the Eastern capital. The Church of Hagia Sophia in Constantinople employed nearly 10,000 workmen and artisans, in a final burst of Roman art under Emperor Justinian (527–565 AD), who also ordered the creation of the famous mosaics of Basilica of San Vitale in the city of Ravenna.

== Painting ==
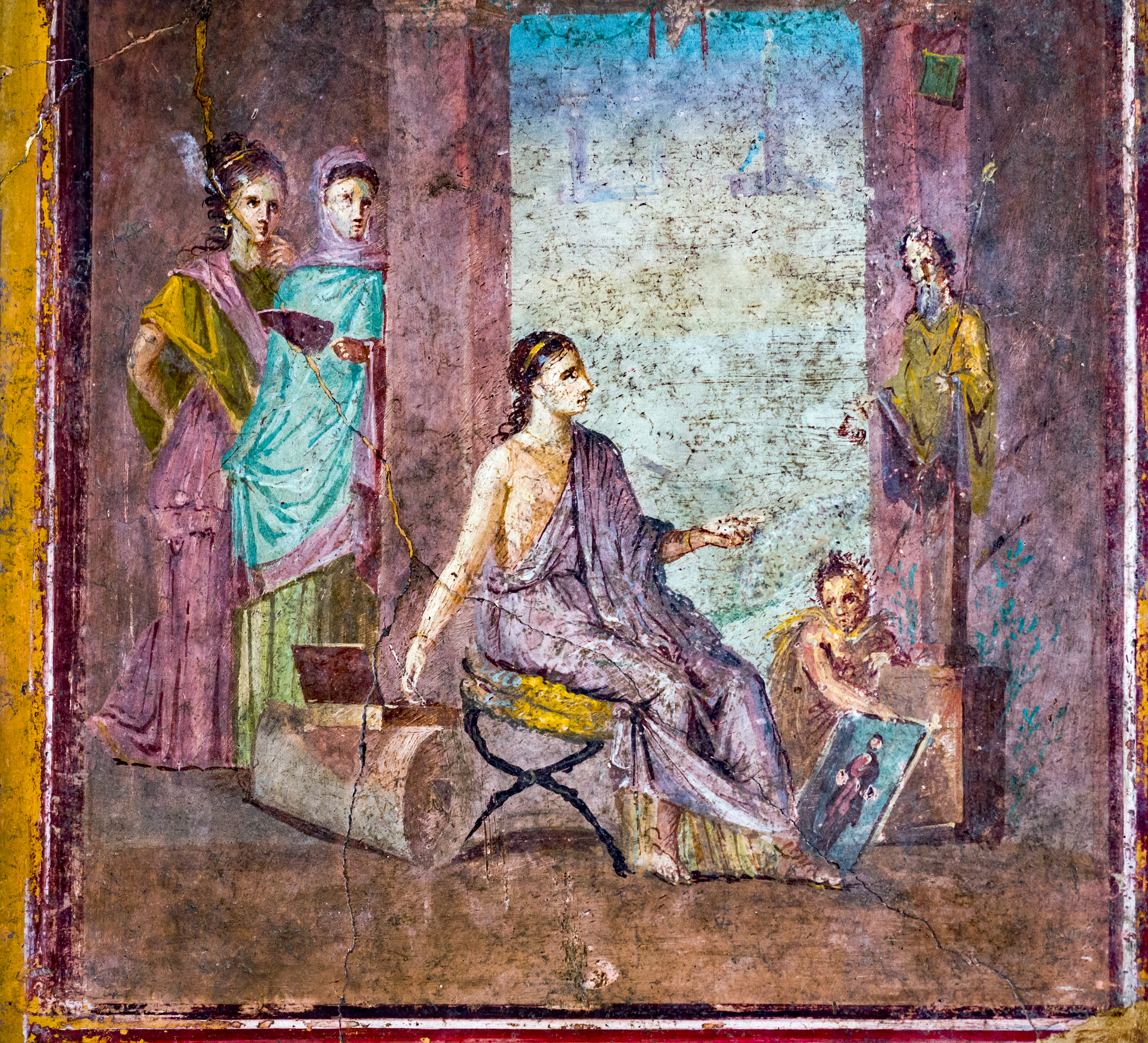
Female painter sitting on a campstool and painting a statue of Dionysus or Priapus onto a panel which is held by a boy. Fresco from Pompeii, 1st century

Of the vast body of Roman painting we now have only a very few pockets of survivals, with many documented types not surviving at all, or doing so only from the very end of the period.

The best known and most important pocket is the wall paintings from Pompeii, Herculaneum and other sites nearby, which show how residents of a wealthy seaside resort decorated their walls in the century or so before the fatal eruption of Mount Vesuvius in AD 79. A succession of dated styles have been defined and analysed by modern art historians beginning with August Mau, showing increasing elaboration.

Wall paintings of the same period have also been found from the remains of prominent aristocratic homes in Rome itself. Much of Nero's palace in Rome, the Domus Aurea, built in the 60s AD, survived as grottos; their paintings inspired the grotesque style of painting popular during the Renaissance. We also have murals from houses identified with the emperor Augustus and his wife Livia, dating to beginning of the first century AD. The Casa della Farnesina is another prominent survival of the early Empire that gave up many paintings.

Outside of Italy, many fragments of painted walls have been found throughout the Empire, but few complete pieces. In the Western provinces of the Empire most fragments date from after the year 200 AD.

From Roman Egypt there are a large number of what are known as Fayum mummy portraits, bust portraits on wood added to the outside of mummies by a Romanized middle class; despite their very distinct local character they are probably broadly representative of Roman style in painted portraits, which are otherwise entirely lost.

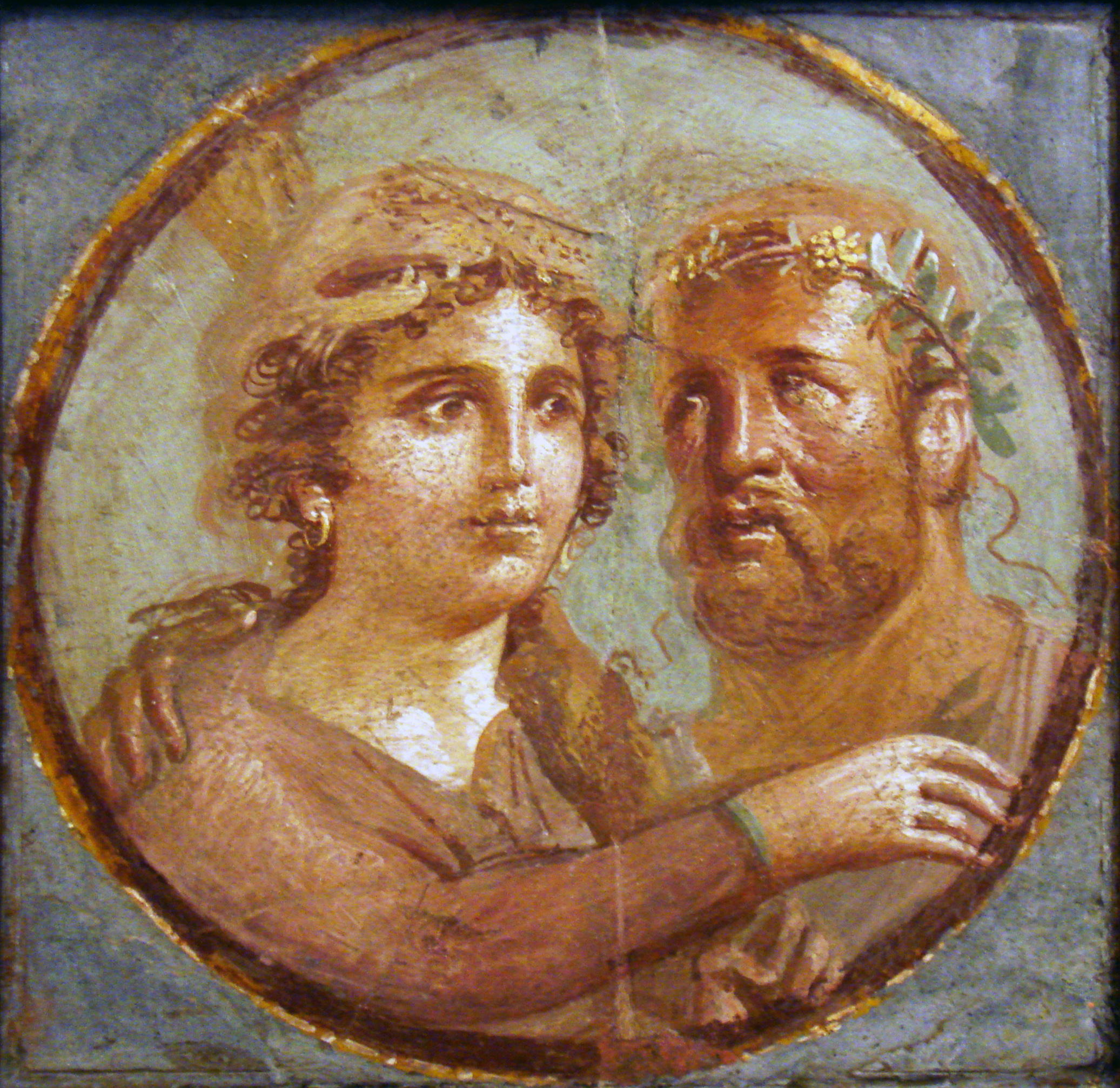
Heracles and Omphale, Roman fresco Pompeian Fourth Style (45-79 AD), Naples National Archaeological Museum, Italy

Starting in the 3rd century AD and finishing by about 400 we have a large body of paintings from the Catacombs of Rome, by no means all Christian, showing the later continuation of the domestic decorative tradition in a version adapted - probably not greatly adapted - for use in burial chambers, in what was probably a rather humbler social milieu than the largest houses in Pompeii.

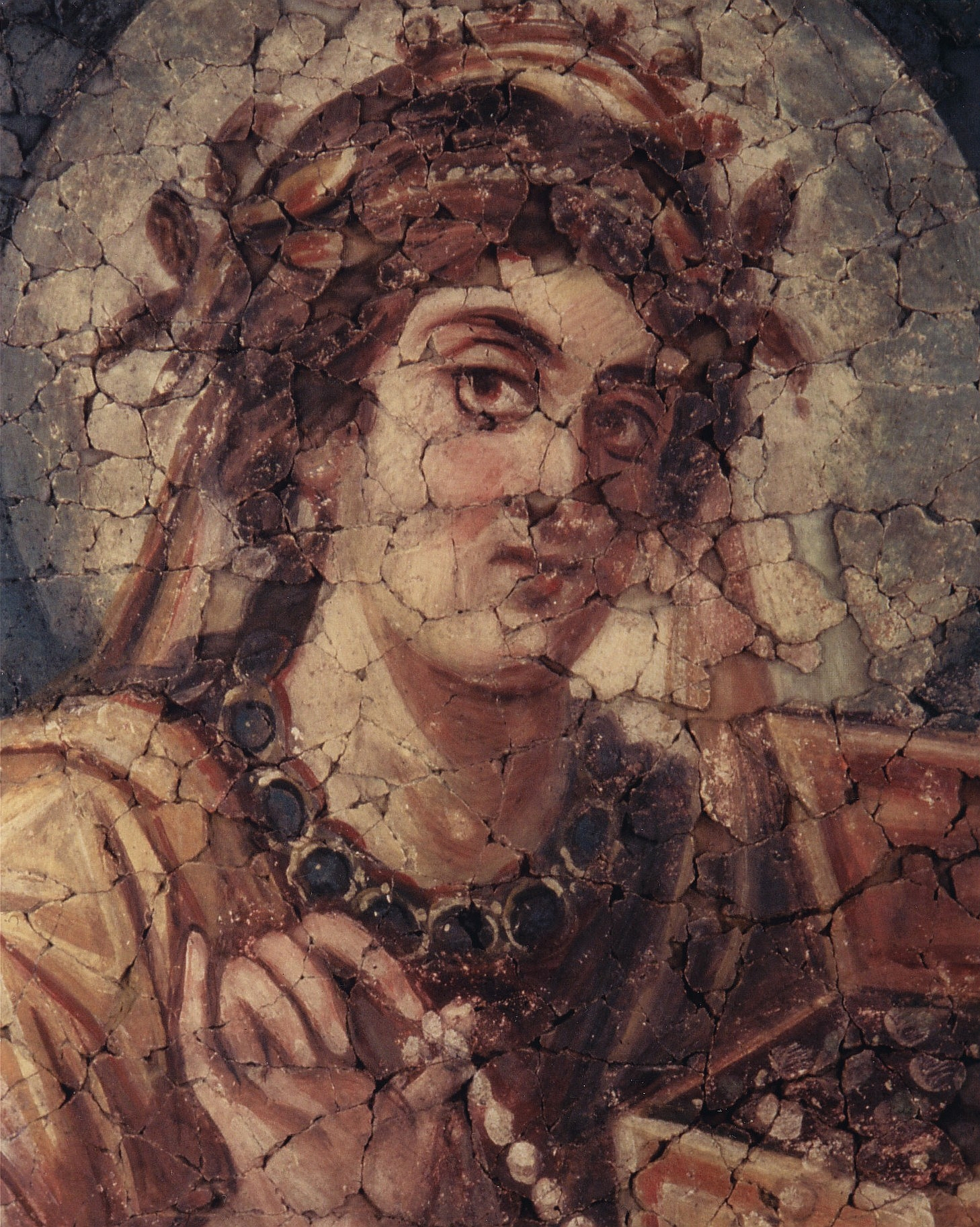
A 4th Century portrait found in Trier, Germany, which may depict Constantia, half-sister to the emperor Constantine.

Nothing remains of the Greek paintings imported to Rome during the 4th and 5th centuries, or of the painting on wood done in Italy during that period. In sum, the range of samples is confined to only about 200 years out of the about 900 years of Roman history, and of provincial and decorative paintings.

Most of this wall painting was done using the a secco (dry) method, but some fresco paintings also existed in Roman times. There is evidence from mosaics and a few inscriptions that some Roman paintings were adaptations or copies of earlier Greek works. However, adding to the confusion is the fact that inscriptions may be recording the names of immigrant Greek artists from Roman times, not from Ancient Greek originals that were copied. The Romans entirely lacked a tradition of figurative vase-painting comparable to that of the Ancient Greeks, which the Etruscans had emulated.

=== Variety of subjects ===
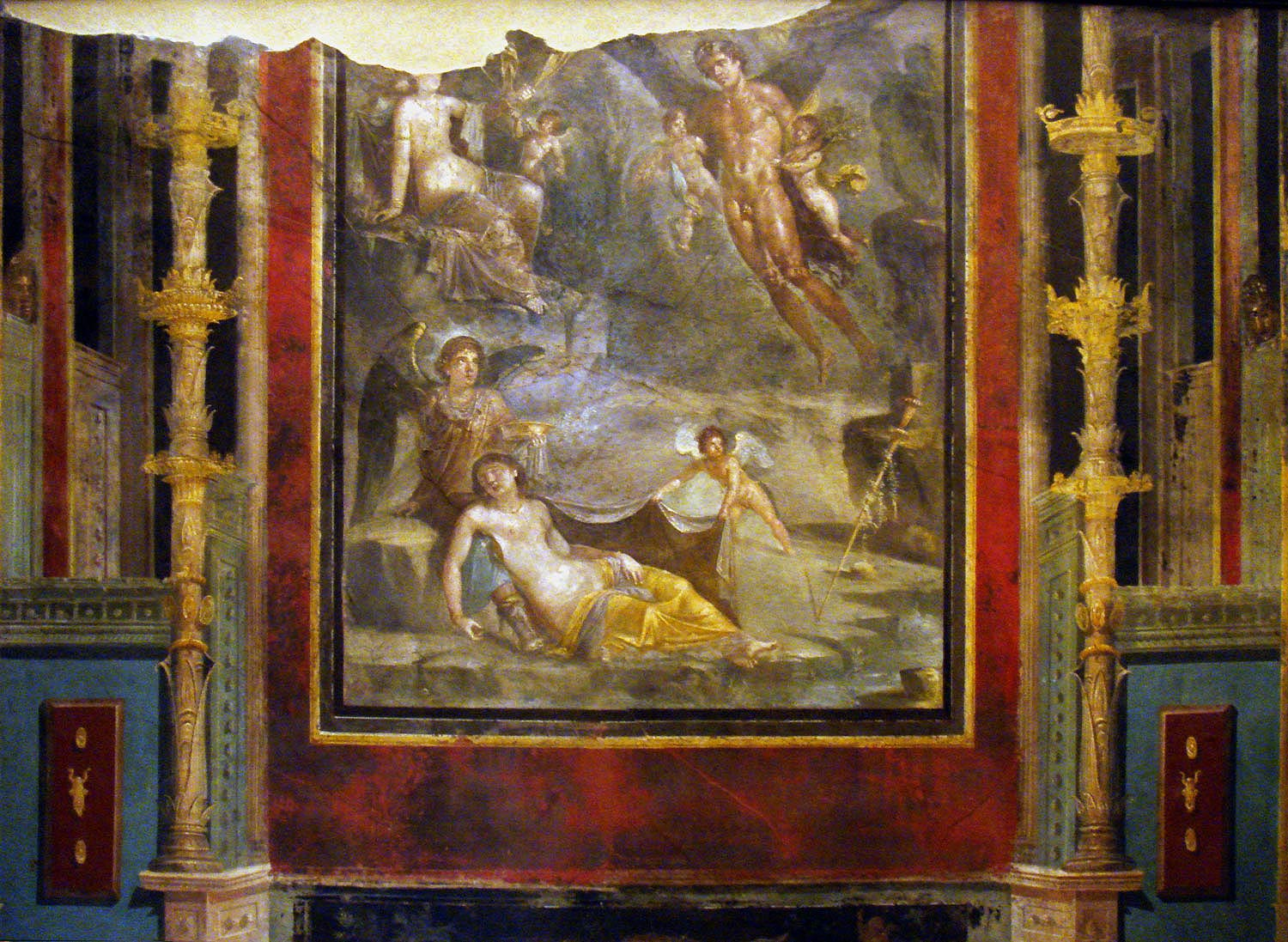
The Wedding of Zephyrus and Chloris (54–68 AD, Pompeian Fourth Style) within painted architectural panels from the Casa del Naviglio

Roman painting provides a wide variety of themes: animals, still life, scenes from everyday life, portraits, and some mythological subjects. During the Hellenistic period, it evoked the pleasures of the countryside and represented scenes of shepherds, herds, rustic temples, rural mountainous landscapes and country houses. Erotic scenes are also relatively common. In the late empire, after 200AD, early Christian themes mixed with pagan imagery survive on catacomb walls.

=== Landscape and vistas ===
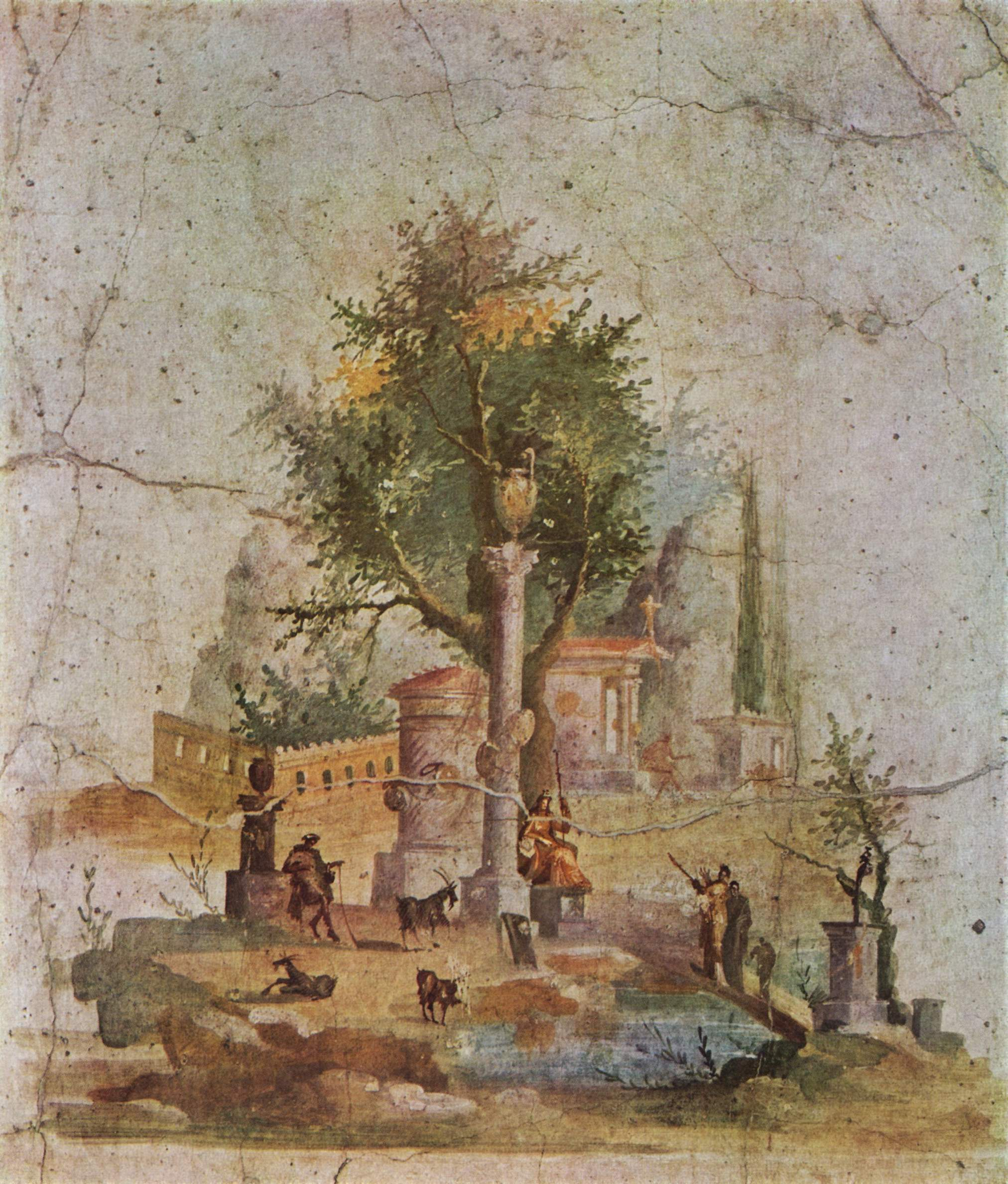
Villa of Agrippa Postumus, Boscotrecase, Third style

The main innovation of Roman painting compared to Greek art was the development of landscapes, in particular incorporating techniques of perspective, though true mathematical perspective developed 1,500 years later. Surface textures, shading, and coloration are well applied but scale and spatial depth was still not rendered accurately. Some landscapes were pure scenes of nature, particularly gardens with flowers and trees, while others were architectural vistas depicting urban buildings. Other landscapes show episodes from mythology, the most famous demonstrating scenes from the Odyssey.

In the cultural point of view, the art of the ancient East would have known landscape painting only as the backdrop to civil or military narrative scenes. This theory is defended by Franz Wickhoff, is debatable. It is possible to see evidence of Greek knowledge of landscape portrayal in Plato's Critias (107b–108b):

... and if we look at the portraiture of divine and of human bodies as executed by painters, in respect of the ease or difficulty with which they succeed in imitating their subjects in the opinion of onlookers, we shall notice in the first place that as regards the earth and mountains and rivers and woods and the whole of heaven, with the things that exist and move therein, we are content if a man is able to represent them with even a small degree of likeness ...

=== Still life ===
Roman still life subjects are often placed in illusionist niches or shelves and depict a variety of everyday objects including fruit, live and dead animals, seafood, and shells. Examples of the theme of the glass jar filled with water were skillfully painted and later served as models for the same subject often painted during the Renaissance and Baroque periods.

=== Portraits ===
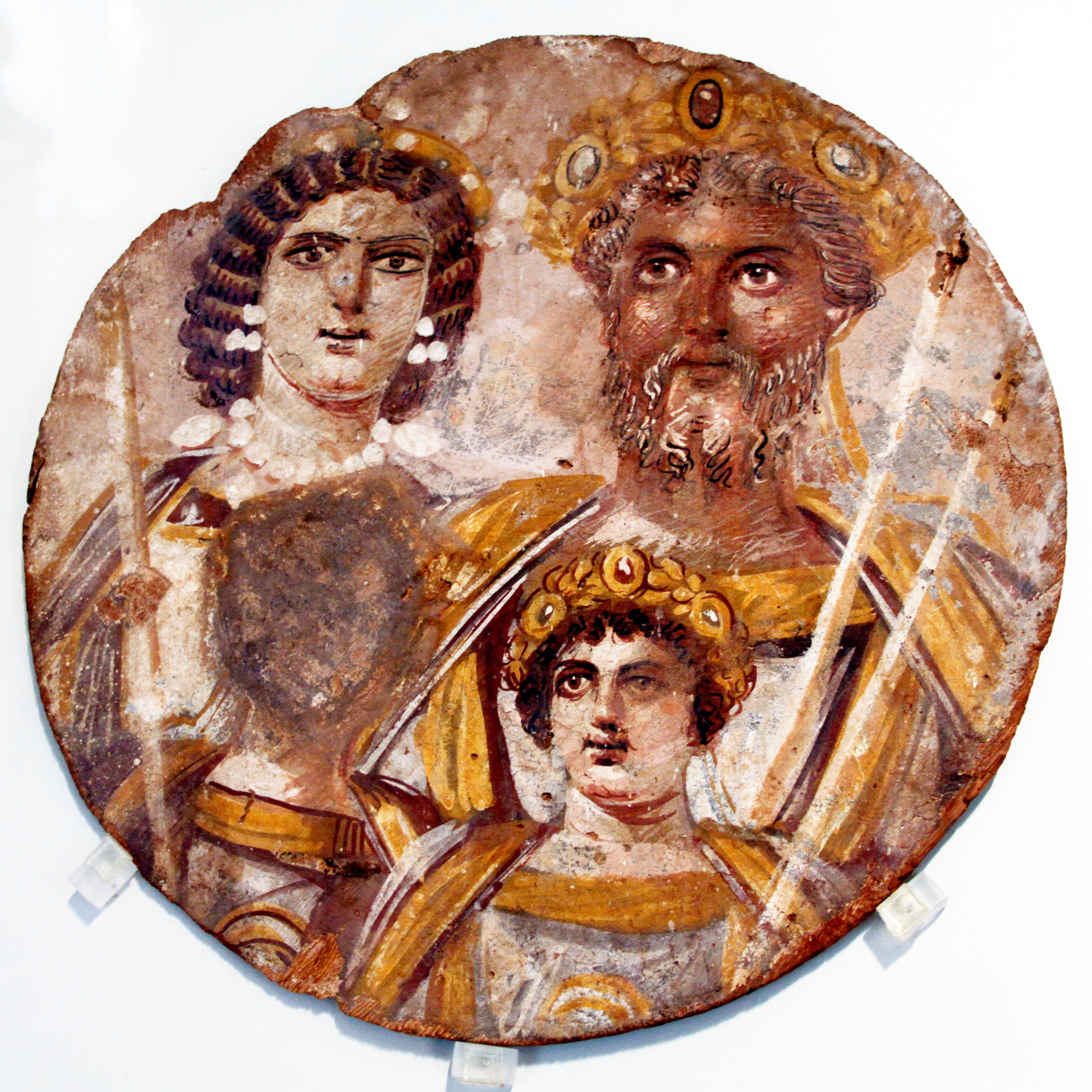
The Severan Tondo, a panel painting of the imperial family, c. 200 AD; Antikensammlung, Berlin

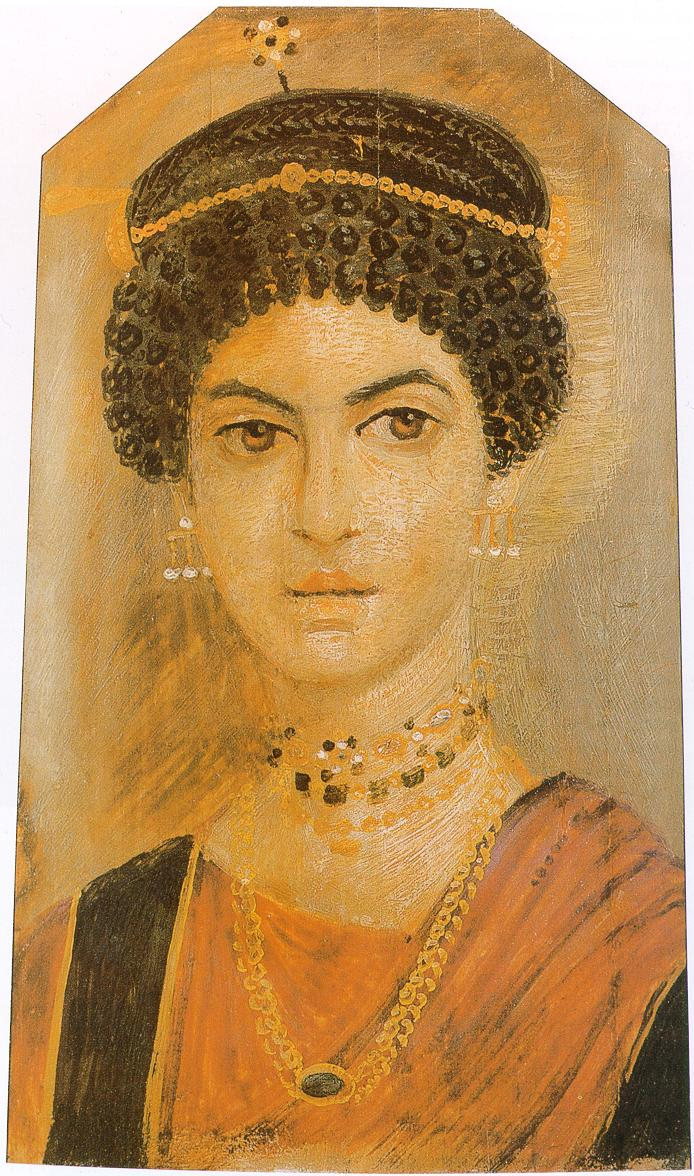
Fayum mummy portrait of a woman from Roman Egypt with a ringlet hairstyle. Royal Museum of Scotland.

Pliny complained of the declining state of Roman portrait art, "The painting of portraits which used to transmit through the ages the accurate likenesses of people, has entirely gone out ... Indolence has destroyed the arts."

In Greece and Rome, wall painting was not considered as high art. The most prestigious form of art besides sculpture was panel painting, i.e. tempera or encaustic painting on wooden panels. Unfortunately, since wood is a perishable material, only a very few examples of such paintings have survived, namely the Severan Tondo from c. 200 AD, a very routine official portrait from some provincial government office, and the well-known Fayum mummy portraits, all from Roman Egypt, and almost certainly not of the highest contemporary quality. The portraits were attached to burial mummies at the face, from which almost all have now been detached. They usually depict a single person, showing the head, or head and upper chest, viewed frontally. The background is always monochrome, sometimes with decorative elements. In terms of artistic tradition, the images clearly derive more from Greco-Roman traditions than Egyptian ones. They are remarkably realistic, though variable in artistic quality, and may indicate that similar art which was widespread elsewhere but did not survive. A few portraits painted on glass and medals from the later empire have survived, as have coin portraits, some of which are considered very realistic as well.

=== Gold glass ===
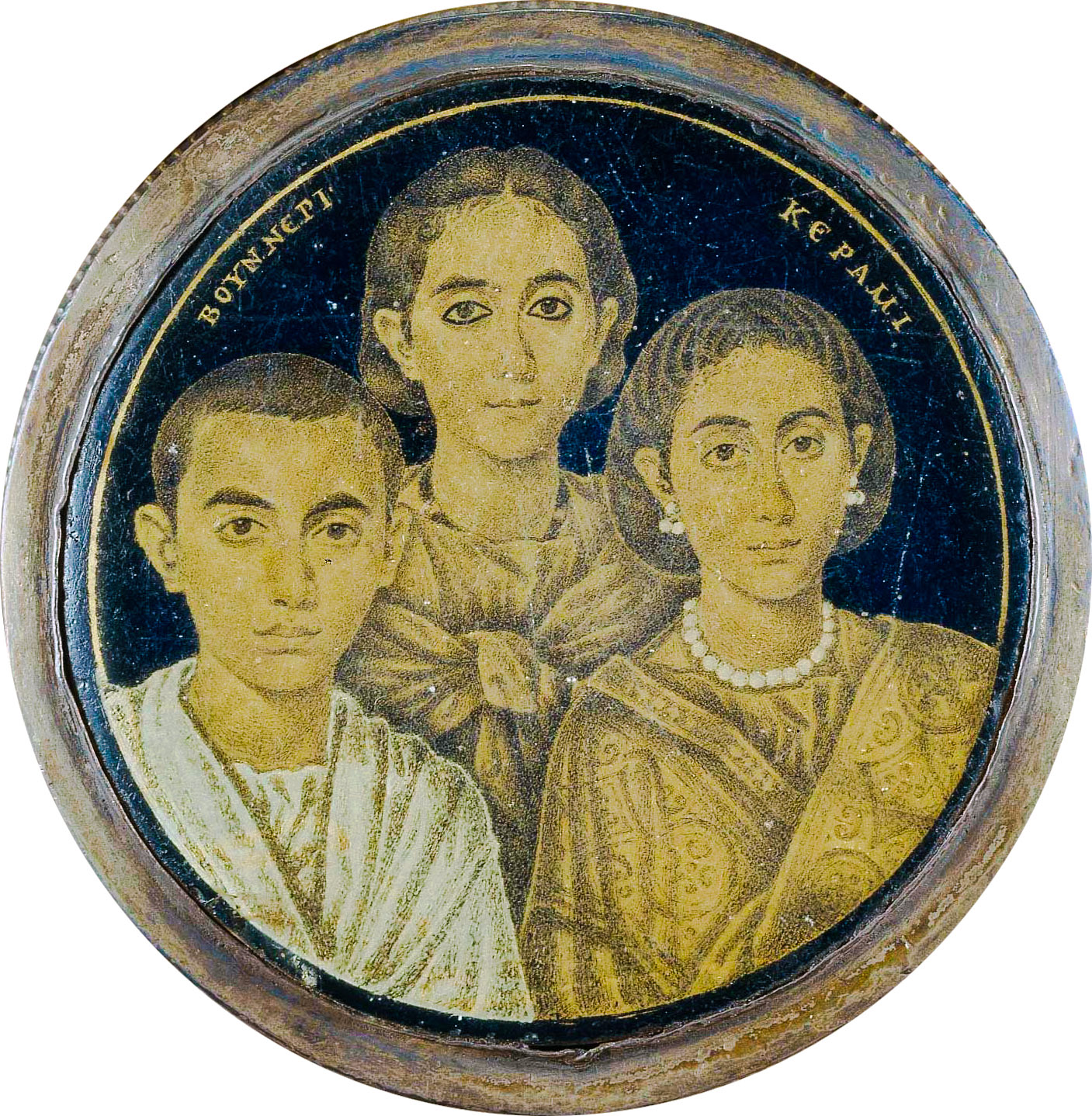
Detail of the gold glass medallion in Brescia (Museo di Santa Giulia), most likely Alexandrian, 3rd century AD

Gold glass, or gold sandwich glass, was a technique for fixing a layer of gold leaf with a design between two fused layers of glass, developed in Hellenistic glass and revived in the 3rd century AD. There are a very few large designs, including a very fine group of portraits from the 3rd century with added paint, but the great majority of the around 500 survivals are roundels that are the cut-off bottoms of wine cups or glasses used to mark and decorate graves in the Catacombs of Rome by pressing them into the mortar. They predominantly date from the 4th and 5th centuries. Most are Christian, though there are many pagan and a few Jewish examples. It is likely that they were originally given as gifts on marriage, or festive occasions such as New Year. Their iconography has been much studied, although artistically they are relatively unsophisticated. Their subjects are similar to the catacomb paintings, but with a difference balance including more portraiture. As time went on there was an increase in the depiction of saints. The same technique began to be used for gold tesserae for mosaics in the mid-1st century in Rome, and by the 5th century these had become the standard background for religious mosaics.

The earlier group are "among the most vivid portraits to survive from Early Christian times. They stare out at us with an extraordinary stern and melancholy intensity", and represent the best surviving indications of what high quality Roman portraiture could achieve in paint. The Gennadios medallion in the Metropolitan Museum of Art in New York, is a fine example of an Alexandrian portrait on blue glass, using a rather more complex technique and naturalistic style than most Late Roman examples, including painting onto the gold to create shading, and with the Greek inscription showing local dialect features. He had perhaps been given or commissioned the piece to celebrate victory in a musical competition. One of the most famous Alexandrian-style portrait medallions, with an inscription in Egyptian Greek, was later mounted in an Early Medieval crux gemmata in Brescia, in the mistaken belief that it showed the pious empress and Gothic queen Galla Placida and her children; in fact the knot in the central figure's dress may mark a devotee of Isis. This is one of a group of 14 pieces dating to the 3rd century AD, all individualized secular portraits of high quality. The inscription on the medallion is written in the Alexandrian dialect of Greek and hence most likely depicts a family from Roman Egypt. The medallion has also been compared to other works of contemporaneous Roman-Egyptian artwork, such as the Fayum mummy portraits. It is thought that the tiny detail of pieces such as these can only have been achieved using lenses. The later glasses from the catacombs have a level of portraiture that is rudimentary, with features, hairstyles and clothes all following stereotypical styles.

=== Genre scenes ===
Roman genre scenes generally depict Romans at leisure and include gambling, music and sexual encounters. Some scenes depict gods and goddesses at leisure.

=== Triumphal paintings ===
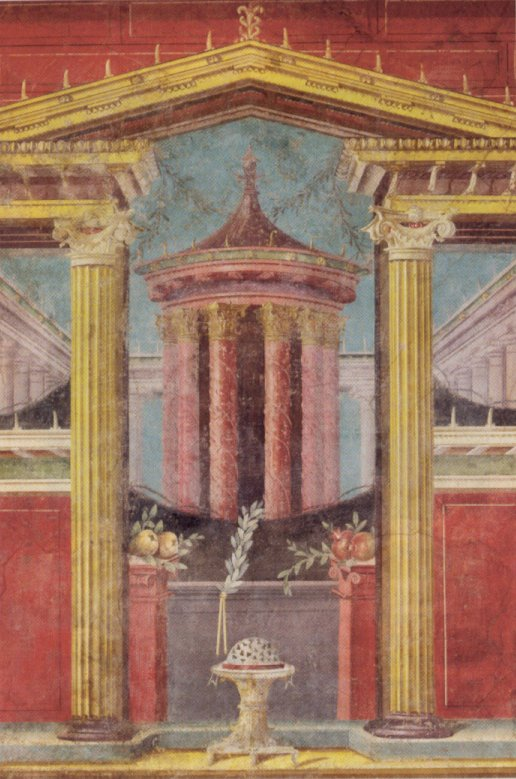
Roman fresco from the Villa Boscoreale, 43–30 BC, Metropolitan Museum of Art

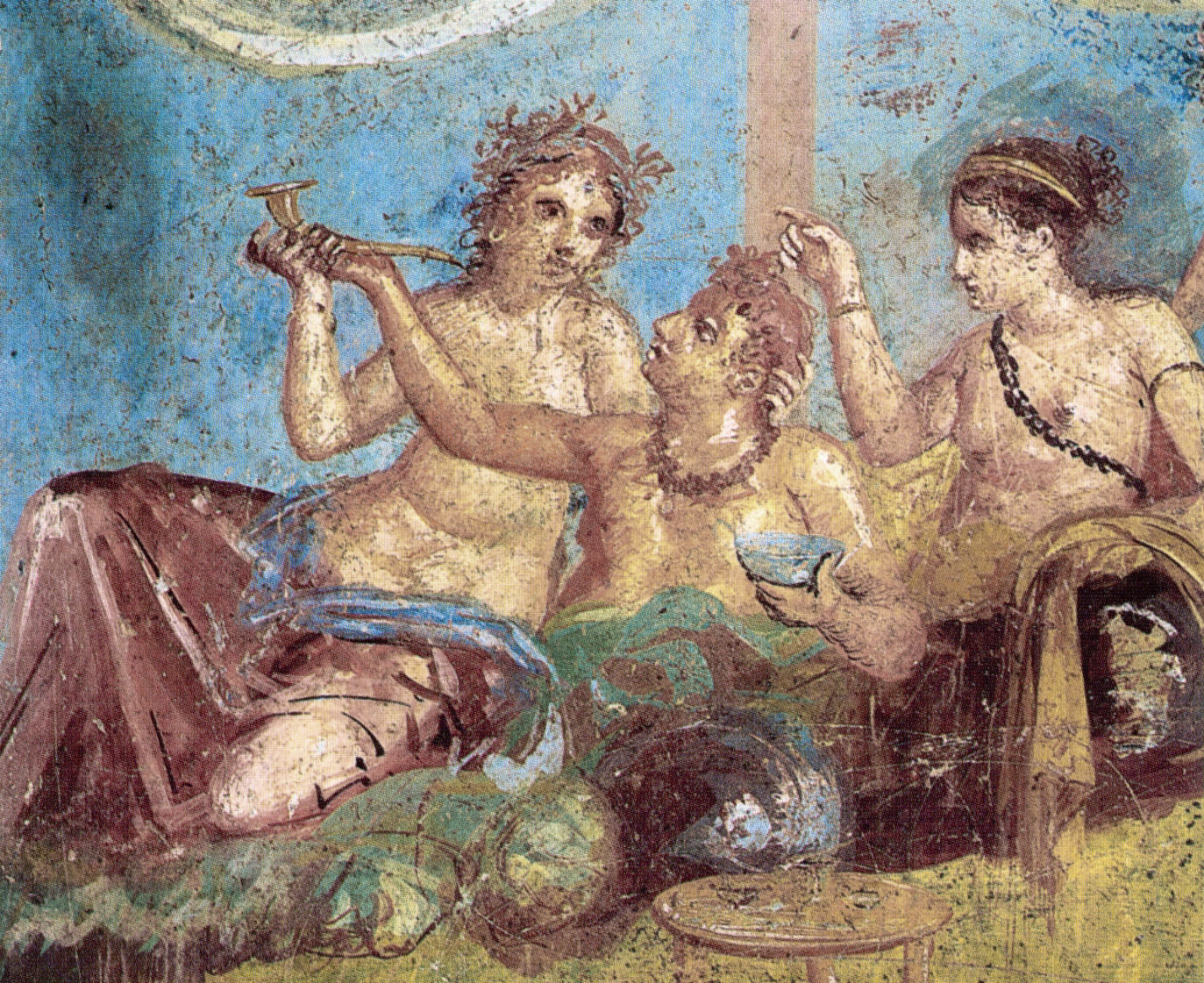
Roman fresco with a banquet scene from the Casa dei Casti Amanti, Pompeii

From the 3rd century BC, a specific genre known as Triumphal Paintings appeared, as indicated by Pliny (XXXV, 22). These were paintings which showed triumphal entries after military victories, represented episodes from the war, and conquered regions and cities. Summary maps were drawn to highlight key points of the campaign. Josephus describes the painting executed on the occasion of Vespasian and Titus's sack of Jerusalem:

There was also wrought gold and ivory fastened about them all; and many resemblances of the war, and those in several ways, and variety of contrivances, affording a most lively portraiture of itself. For there was to be seen a happy country laid waste, and entire squadrons of enemies slain; while some of them ran away, and some were carried into captivity; with walls of great altitude and magnitude overthrown and ruined by machines; with the strongest fortifications taken, and the walls of most populous cities upon the tops of hills seized on, and an army pouring itself within the walls; as also every place full of slaughter, and supplications of the enemies, when they were no longer able to lift up their hands in way of opposition. Fire also sent upon temples was here represented, and houses overthrown, and falling upon their owners: rivers also, after they came out of a large and melancholy desert, ran down, not into a land cultivated, nor as drink for men, or for cattle, but through a land still on fire upon every side; for the Jews related that such a thing they had undergone during this war. Now the workmanship of these representations was so magnificent and lively in the construction of the things, that it exhibited what had been done to such as did not see it, as if they had been there really present. On the top of every one of these pageants was placed the commander of the city that was taken, and the manner wherein he was taken.

These paintings have disappeared, but they likely influenced the composition of the historical reliefs carved on military sarcophagi, the Arch of Titus, and Trajan's Column. This evidence underscores the significance of landscape painting, which sometimes tended towards being perspective plans.

Ranuccio also describes the oldest painting to be found in Rome, in a tomb on the Esquiline Hill:

It describes a historical scene, on a clear background, painted in four superimposed sections. Several people are identified, such Marcus Fannius and Marcus Fabius. These are larger than the other figures ... In the second zone, to the left, is a city encircled with crenellated walls, in front of which is a large warrior equipped with an oval buckler and a feathered helmet; near him is a man in a short tunic, armed with a spear...Around these two are smaller soldiers in short tunics, armed with spears...In the lower zone a battle is taking place, where a warrior with oval buckler and a feathered helmet is shown larger than the others, whose weapons allow to assume that these are probably Samnites.

This episode is difficult to pinpoint. One of Ranuccio's hypotheses is that it refers to a victory of the consul Fabius Maximus Rullianus during the second war against Samnites in 326 BC. The presentation of the figures with sizes proportional to their importance is typically Roman, and finds itself in plebeian reliefs. This painting is in the infancy of triumphal painting, and would have been accomplished by the beginning of the 3rd century BC to decorate the tomb.

== Sculpture ==
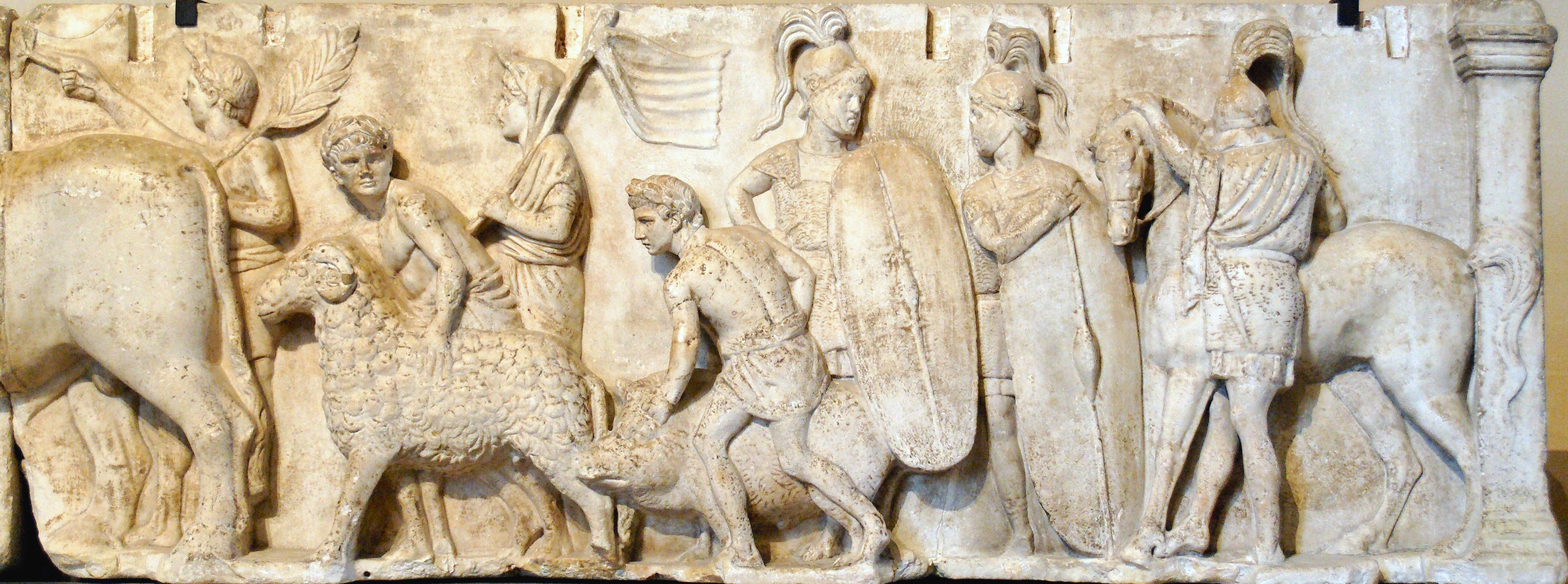
Detail from the Ahenobarbus relief showing two Roman soldiers, c. 122 BC

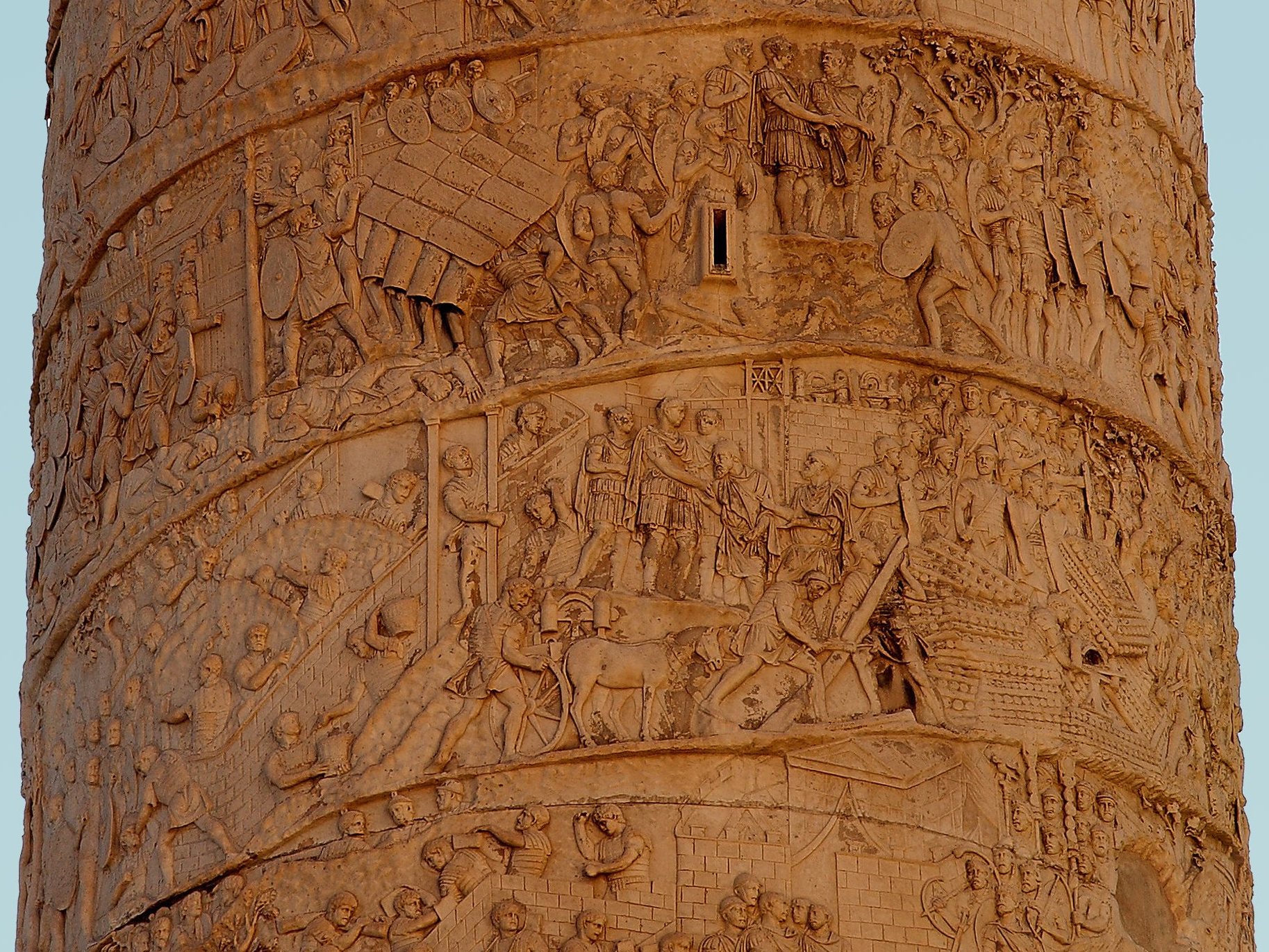
Section of Trajan's Column, 113 AD, with scenes from the Dacian Wars

Early Roman art was influenced by the art of Greece and that of the neighbouring Etruscans, themselves greatly influenced by their Greek trading partners. An Etruscan speciality was near life size tomb effigies in terracotta, usually lying on top of a sarcophagus lid propped up on one elbow in the pose of a diner in that period. As the expanding Roman Republic began to conquer Greek territory, at first in Southern Italy and then the entire Hellenistic world except for the Parthian far east, official and patrician sculpture became largely an extension of the Hellenistic style, from which specifically Roman elements are hard to disentangle, especially as so much Greek sculpture survives only in copies of the Roman period. By the 2nd century BC, "most of the sculptors working in Rome" were Greek, often enslaved in conquests such as that of Corinth (146 BC), and sculptors continued to be mostly Greeks, often slaves, whose names are very rarely recorded. Vast numbers of Greek statues were imported to Rome, whether as booty or the result of extortion or commerce, and temples were often decorated with re-used Greek works.

A native Italian style can be seen in the tomb monuments of prosperous middle-class Romans, which very often featured portrait busts, and portraiture is arguably the main strength of Roman sculpture. There are no survivals from the tradition of masks of ancestors that were worn in processions at the funerals of the great families and otherwise displayed in the home, but many of the busts that survive must represent ancestral figures, perhaps from the large family tombs like the Tomb of the Scipios or the later mausolea outside the city. The famous bronze head supposedly of Lucius Junius Brutus is very variously dated, but taken as a very rare survival of Italic style under the Republic, in the preferred medium of bronze. Similarly stern and forceful heads are seen in the coins of the consuls, and in the Imperial period coins as well as busts sent around the Empire to be placed in the basilicas of provincial cities were the main visual form of imperial propaganda; even Londinium had a near-colossal statue of Nero, though far smaller than the 30-metre-high Colossus of Nero in Rome, now lost. The Tomb of Eurysaces the Baker, a successful freedman (c. 50-20 BC) has a frieze that is an unusually large example of the "plebeian" style. Imperial portraiture was initially Hellenized and highly idealized, as in the Blacas Cameo and other portraits of Augustus.

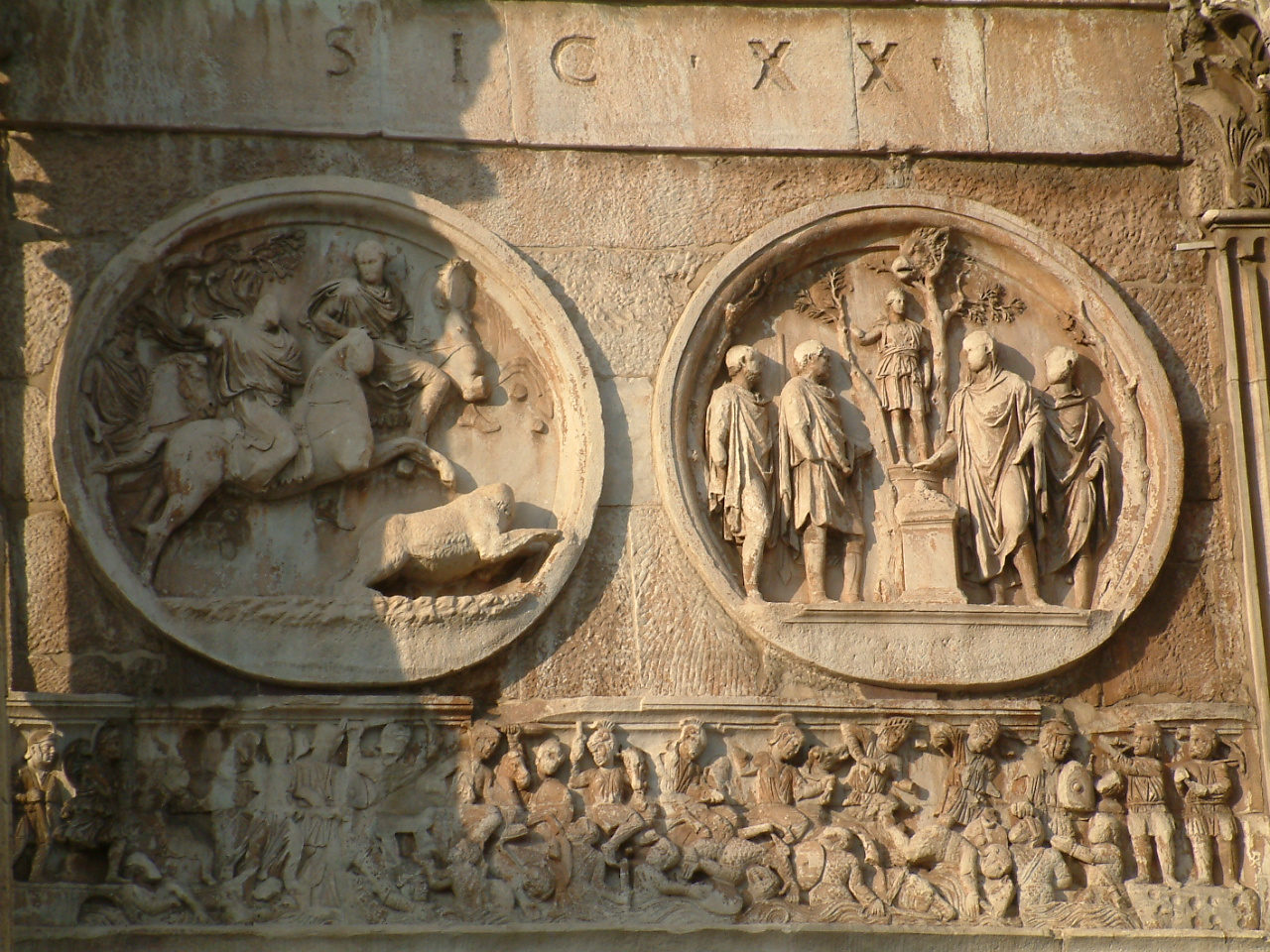
Arch of Constantine, 315: Hadrian lion-hunting (left) and sacrificing (right), above a section of the Constantinian frieze, showing the contrast of styles.

The Romans did not generally attempt to compete with free-standing Greek works of heroic exploits from history or mythology, but from early on produced historical works in relief, culminating in the great Roman triumphal columns with continuous narrative reliefs winding around them, of which those commemorating Trajan (113 AD) and Marcus Aurelius (by 193) survive in Rome, where the Ara Pacis ("Altar of Peace", 13 BC) represents the official Greco-Roman style at its most classical and refined, and the Sperlonga sculptures it at its most baroque. Some late Roman public sculptures developed a massive, simplified style that sometimes anticipates Soviet socialist realism. Among other major examples are the earlier re-used reliefs on the Arch of Constantine and the base of the Column of Antoninus Pius (161), Campana reliefs were cheaper pottery versions of marble reliefs and the taste for relief was from the imperial period expanded to the sarcophagus.

All forms of luxury small sculpture continued to be patronized, and quality could be extremely high, as in the silver Warren Cup, glass Lycurgus Cup, and large cameos like the Gemma Augustea, Gonzaga Cameo and the "Great Cameo of France". For a much wider section of the population, moulded relief decoration of pottery vessels and small figurines were produced in great quantity and often considerable quality.

After moving through a late 2nd century "baroque" phase, in the 3rd century, Roman art largely abandoned, or simply became unable to produce, sculpture in the classical tradition, a change whose causes remain much discussed. Even the most important imperial monuments now showed stumpy, large-eyed figures in a harsh frontal style, in simple compositions emphasizing power at the expense of grace. The contrast is famously illustrated in the Arch of Constantine of 315 in Rome, which combines sections in the new style with roundels in the earlier full Greco-Roman style taken from elsewhere, and the Four Tetrarchs (c. 305) from the new capital of Constantinople, now in Venice. Ernst Kitzinger found in both monuments the same "stubby proportions, angular movements, an ordering of parts through symmetry and repetition and a rendering of features and drapery folds through incisions rather than modelling... The hallmark of the style wherever it appears consists of an emphatic hardness, heaviness and angularity – in short, an almost complete rejection of the classical tradition".

This revolution in style shortly preceded the period in which Christianity was adopted by the Roman state and the great majority of the people, leading to the end of large religious sculpture, with large statues now only used for emperors, as in the famous fragments of a colossal acrolithic statue of Constantine, and the 4th or 5th century Colossus of Barletta. However rich Christians continued to commission reliefs for sarcophagi, as in the Sarcophagus of Junius Bassus, and very small sculpture, especially in ivory, was continued by Christians, building on the style of the consular diptych.

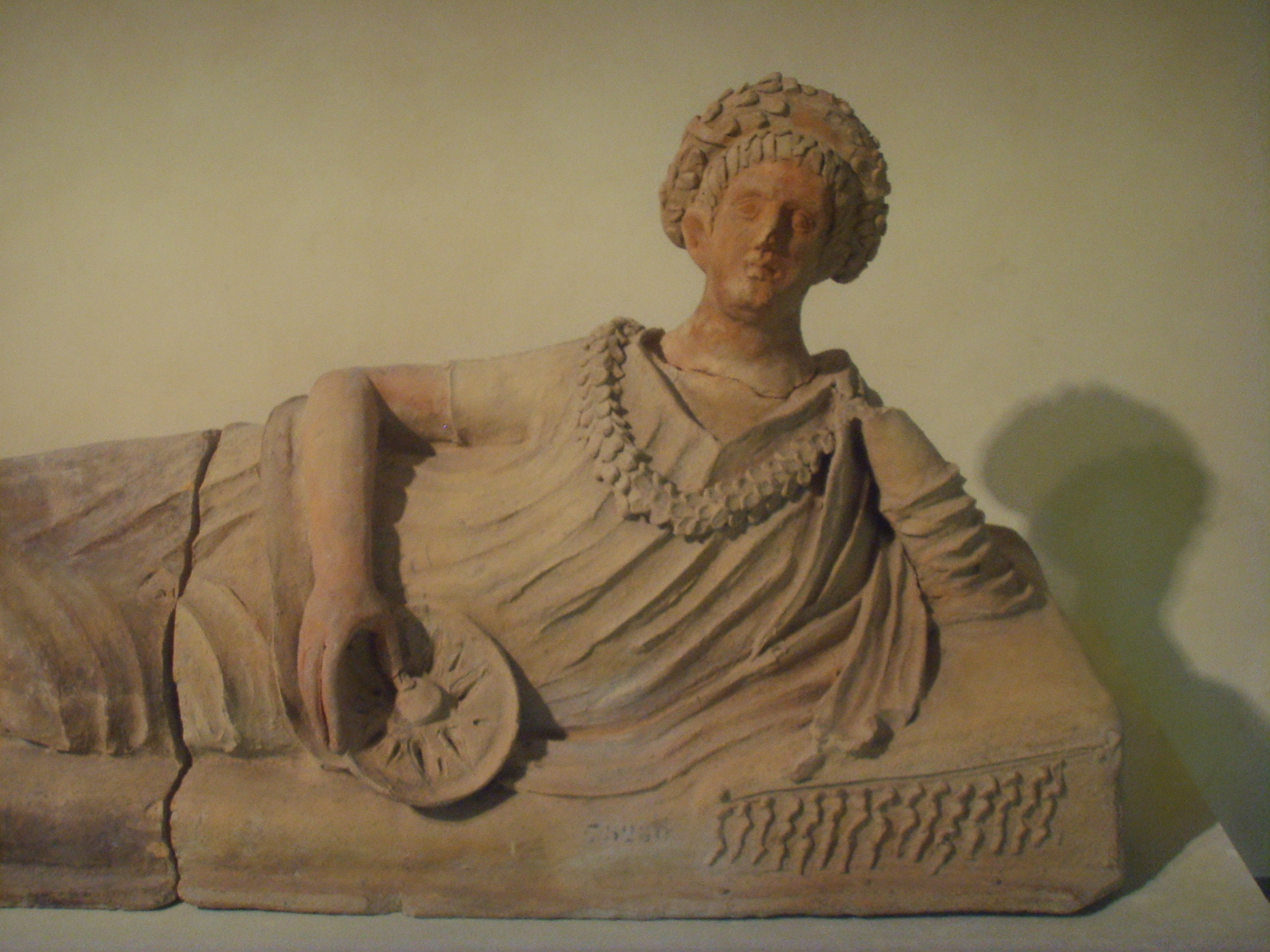
Etruscan sarcophagus, 3rd century BC

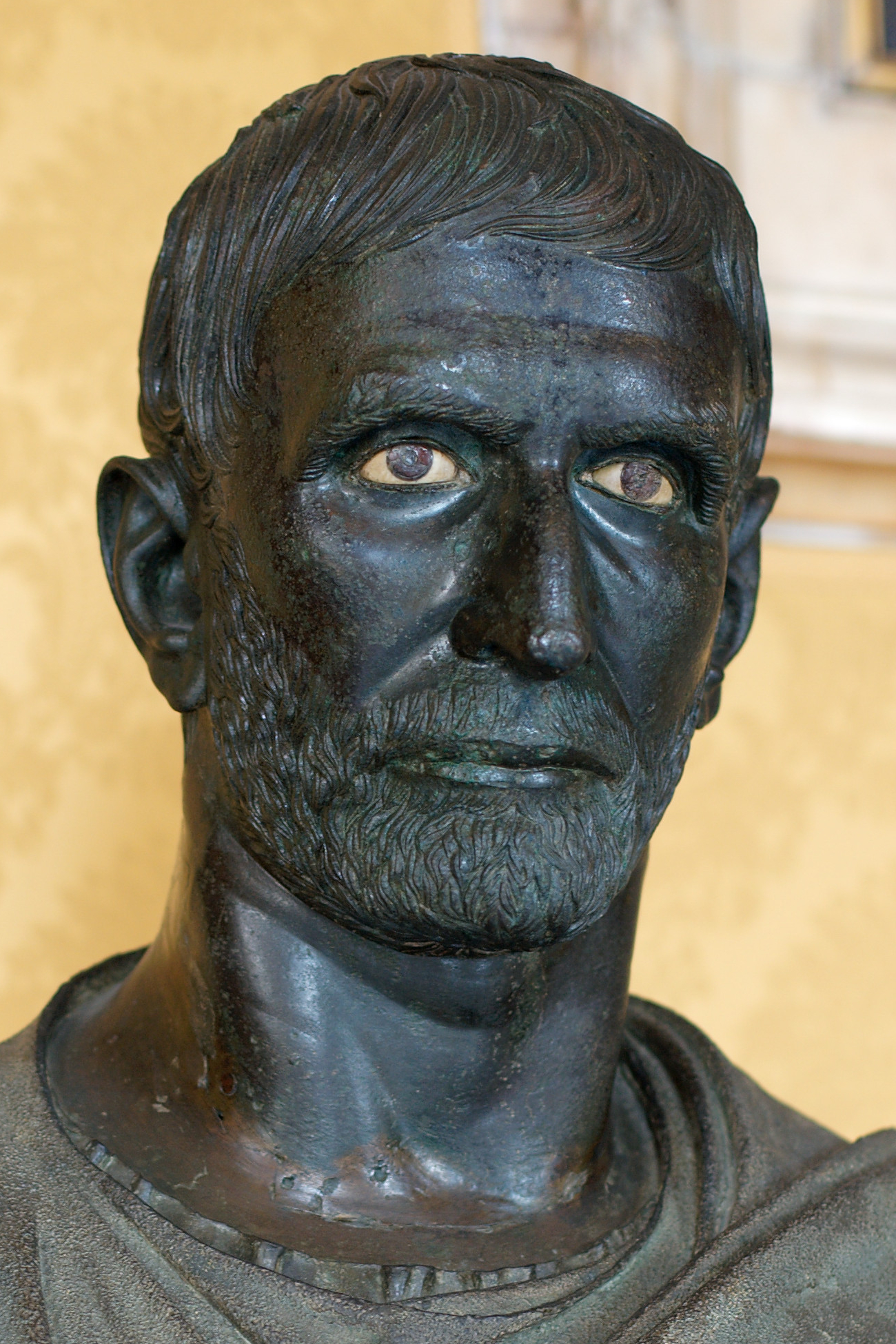
The "Capitoline Brutus", dated to the 4th to 3rd centuries BC

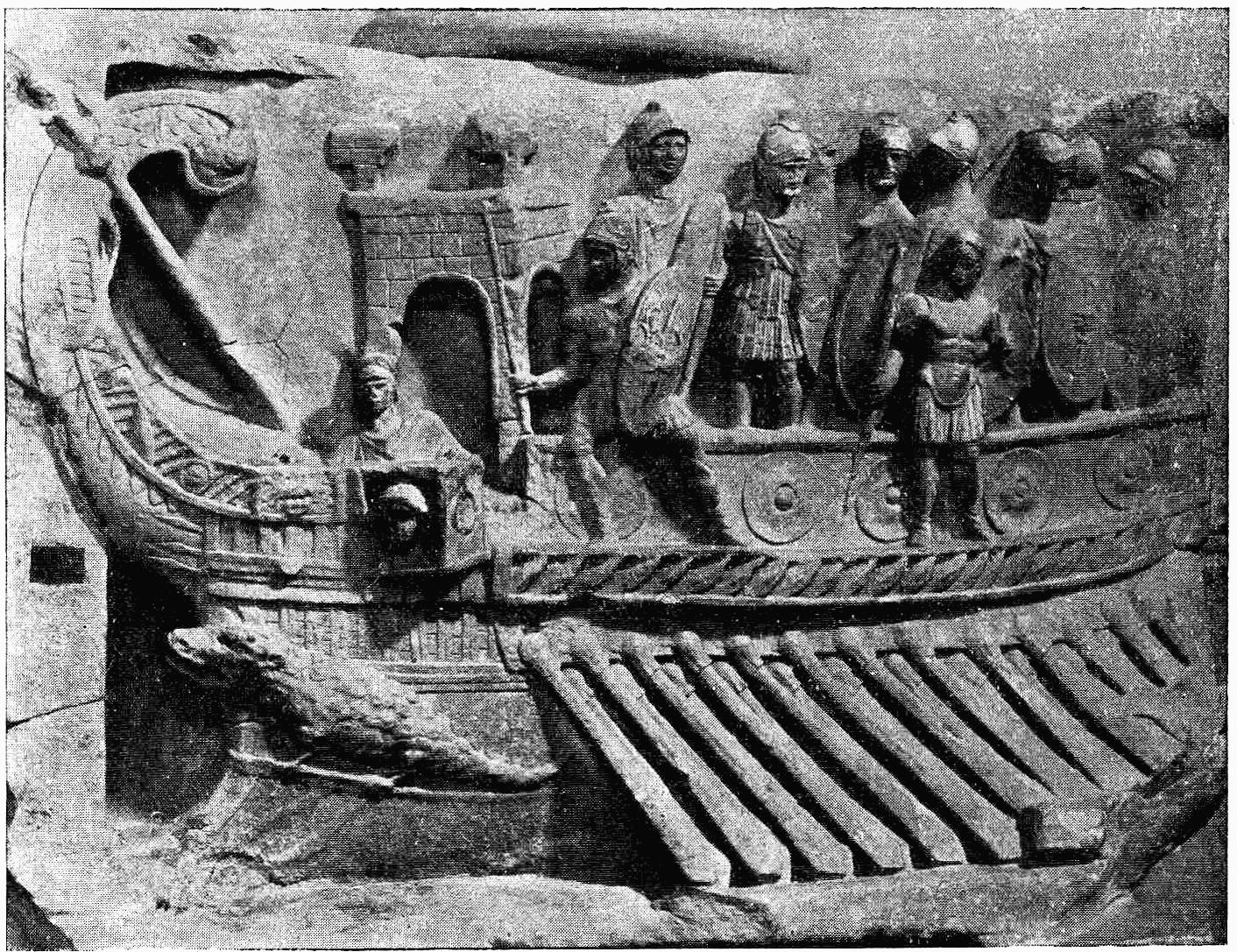
A Roman naval bireme depicted in a relief from the Temple of Fortuna Primigenia in Praeneste (Palastrina), which was built c. 120 BC; exhibited in the Pius-Clementine Museum (Museo Pio-Clementino) in the Vatican Museums.

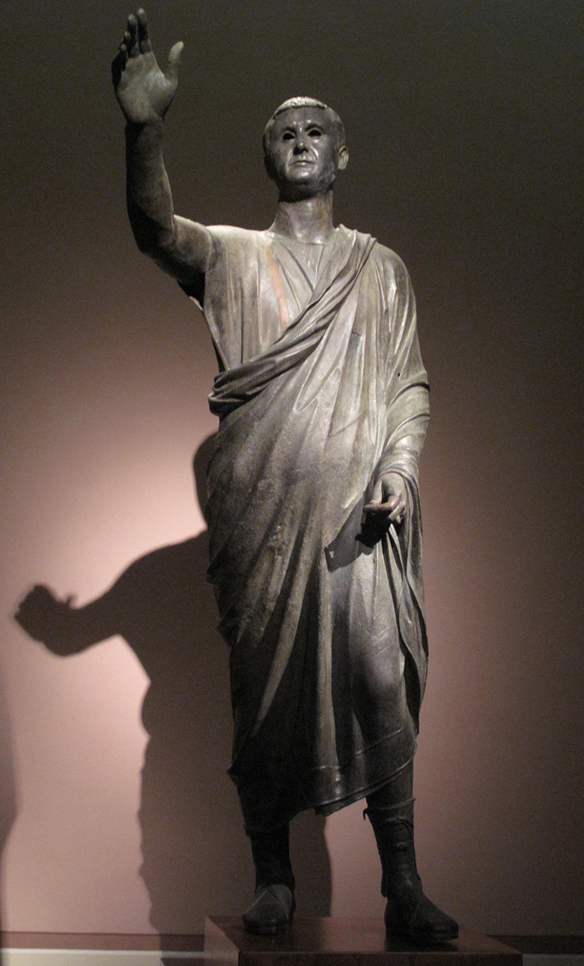
The Orator, c. 100 BC, an Etrusco-Roman bronze statue depicting Aule Metele (Latin: Aulus Metellus), an Etruscan man wearing a Roman toga while engaged in rhetoric; the statue features an inscription in the Etruscan alphabet

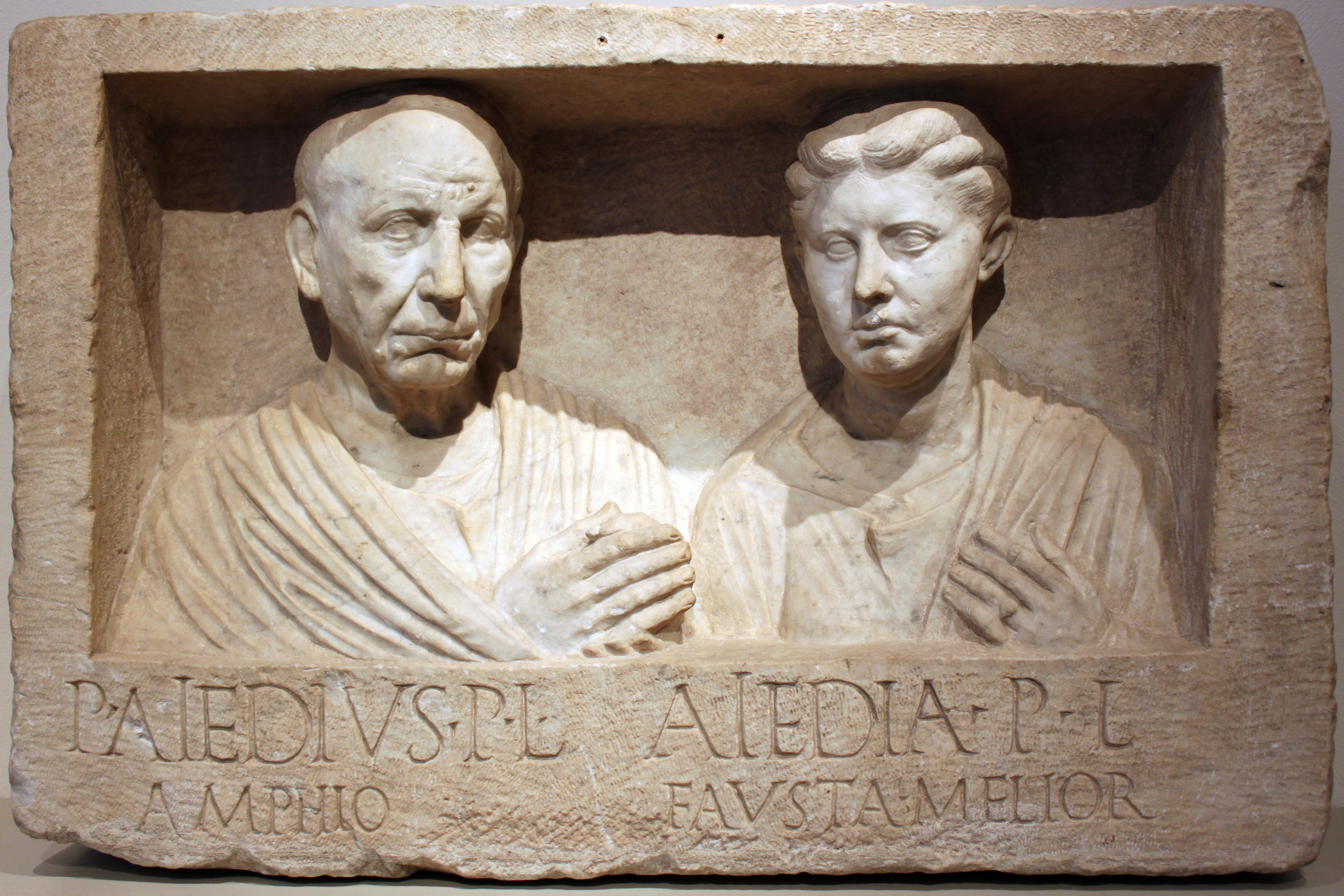
The Grave relief of Publius Aiedius and Aiedia, 30 BC, Pergamon Museum (Berlin)

Augustus of Prima Porta, statue of the emperor Augustus, 1st century AD, Vatican Museums

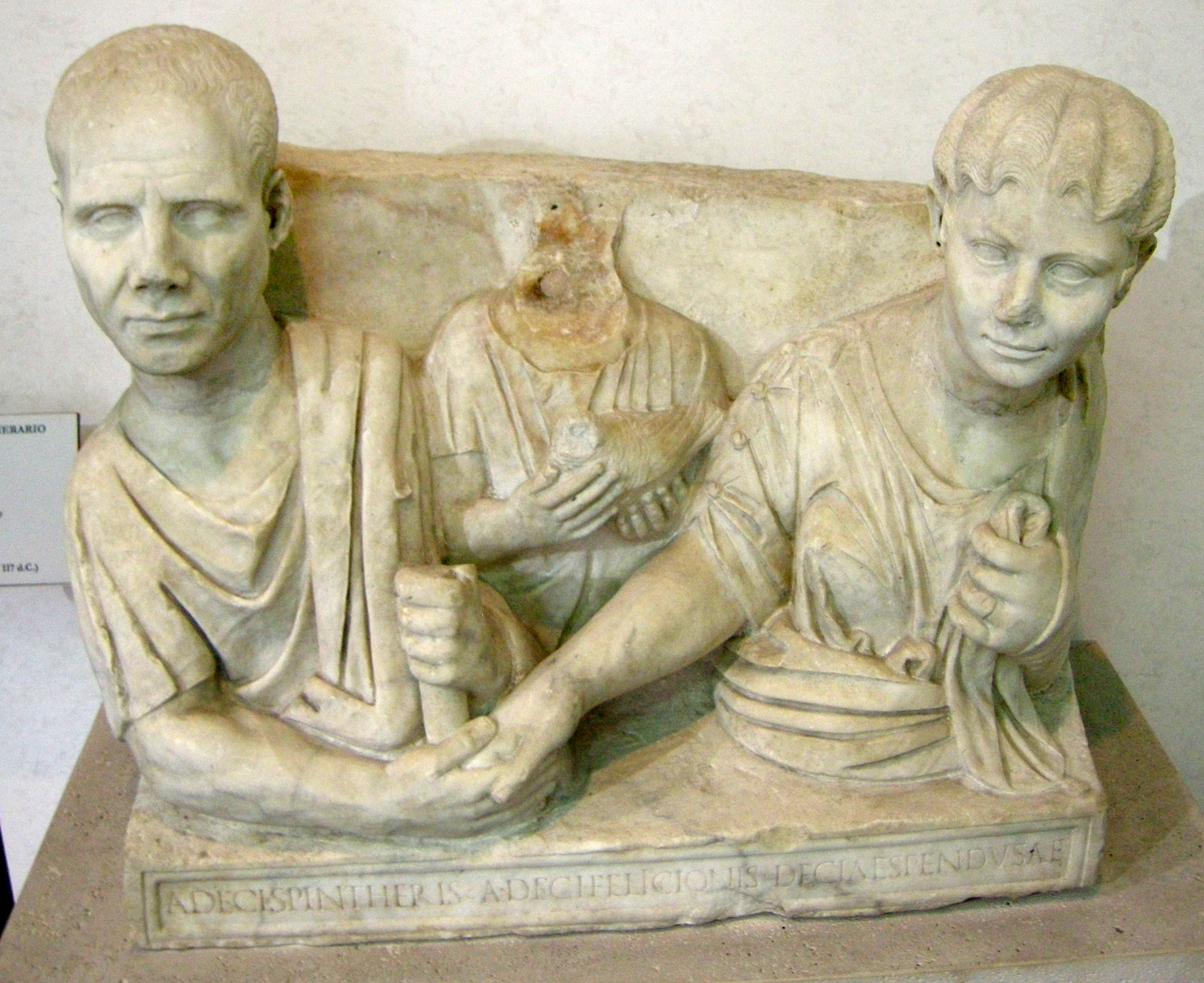
Tomb relief of the Decii, 98–117 AD

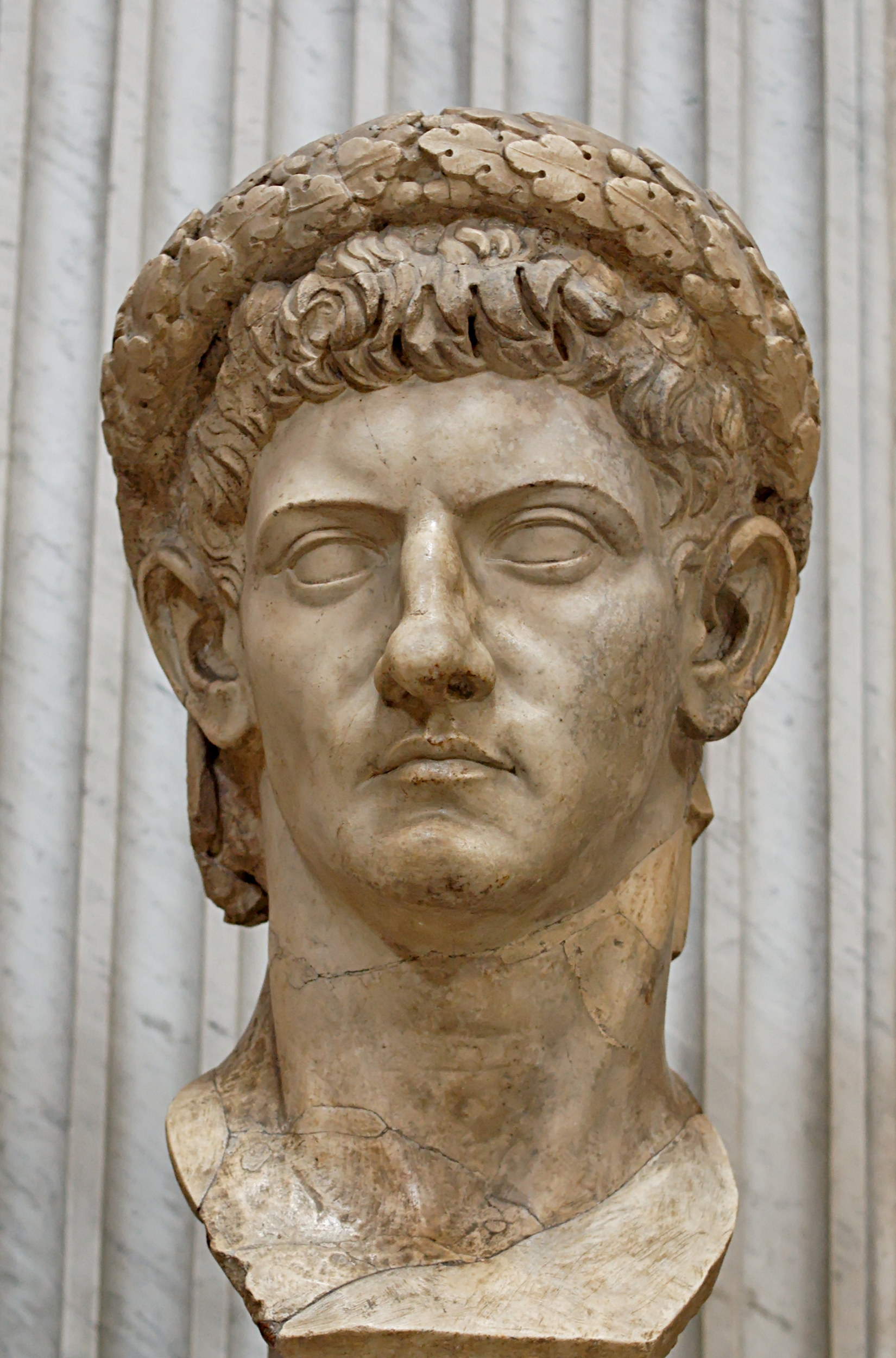
Bust of Emperor Claudius, c. 50 AD, (reworked from a bust of emperor Caligula), Vatican Museums

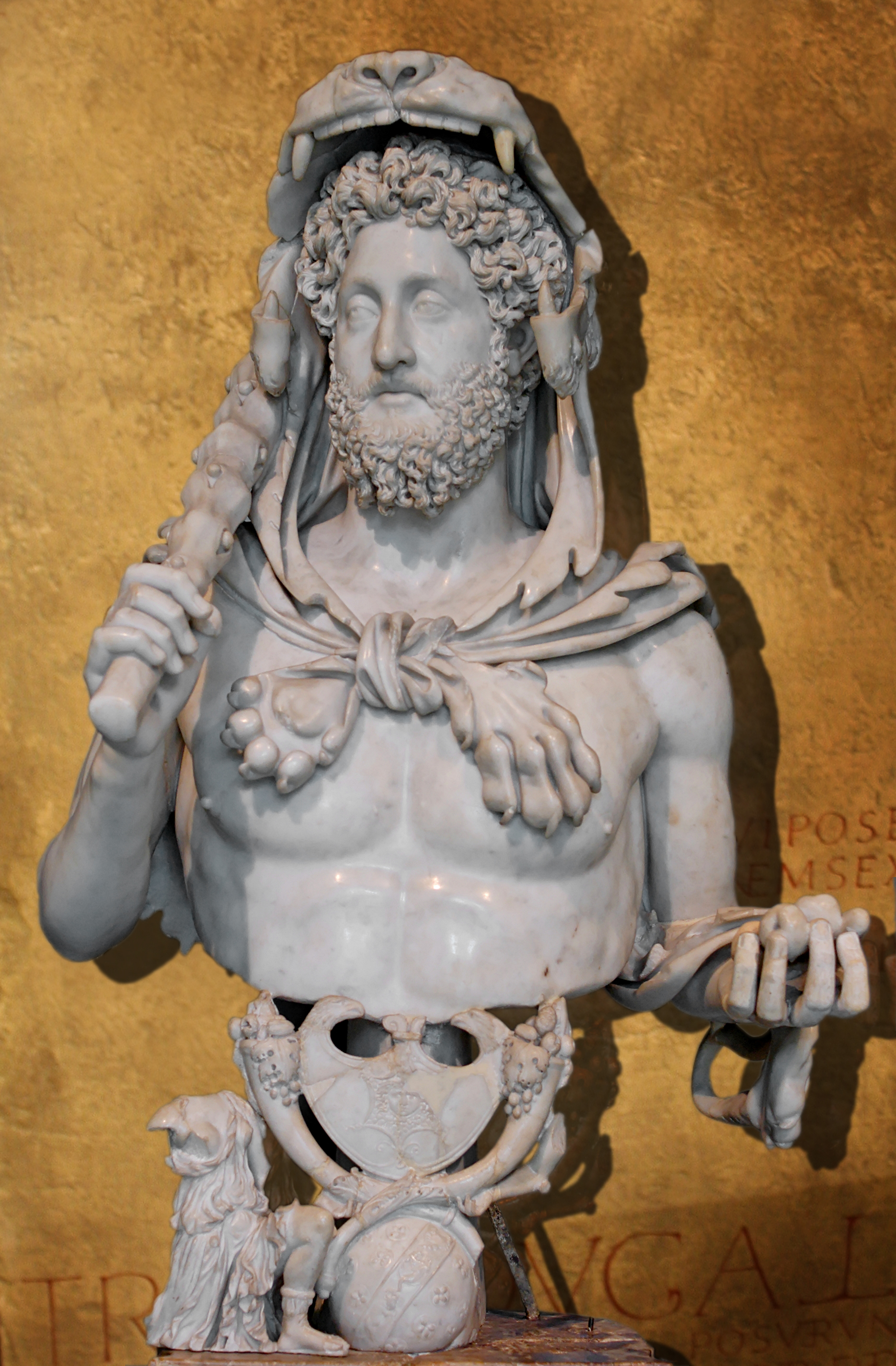
Commodus dressed as Hercules, c. 191 AD, in the late imperial "baroque" style; Capitoline Museum, Rome.

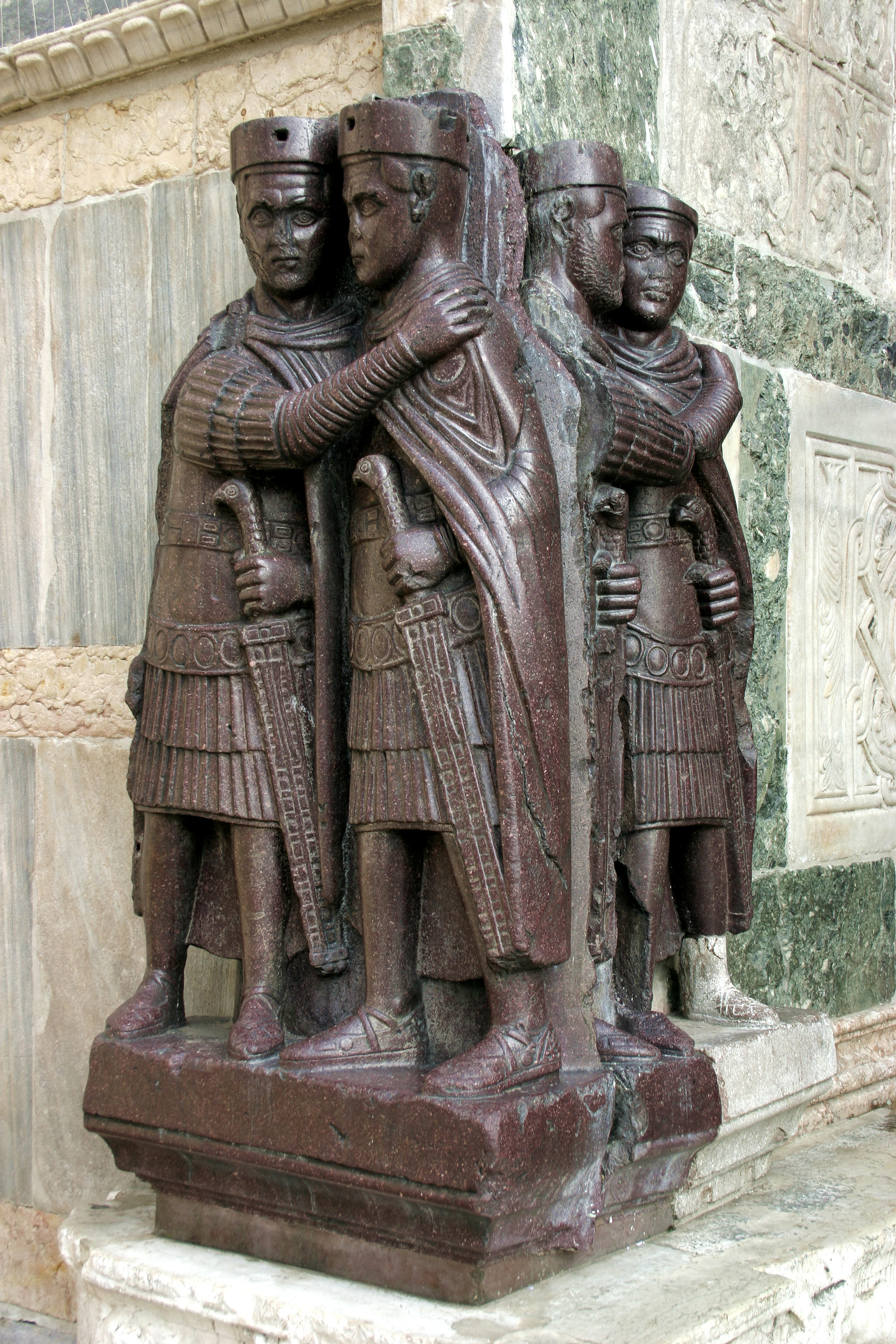
The Four Tetrarchs, c. 305, showing the new anti-classical style, in porphyry, now San Marco, Venice

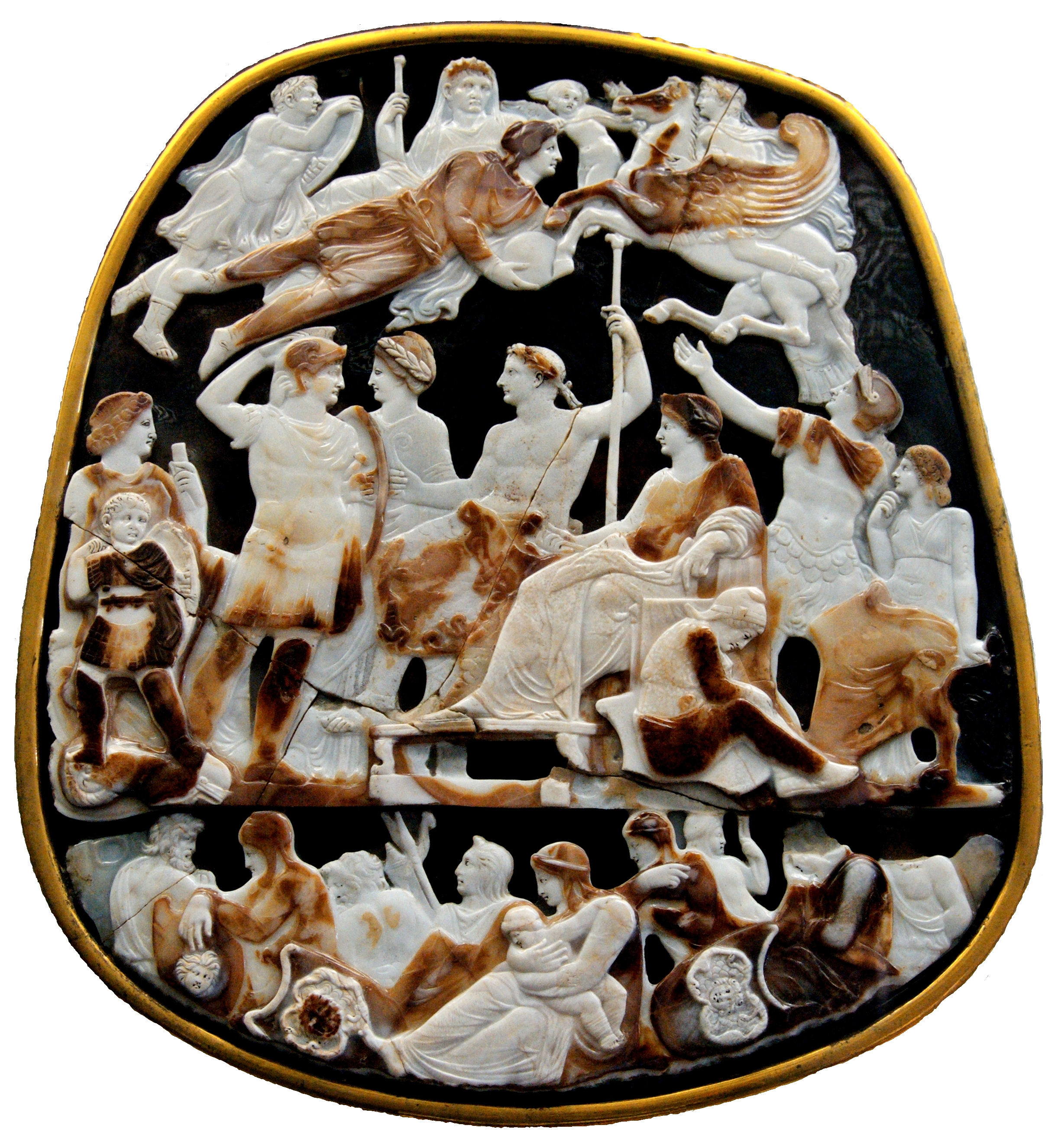
The cameo gem known as the "Great Cameo of France", c. 23 AD, with an allegory of Augustus and his family

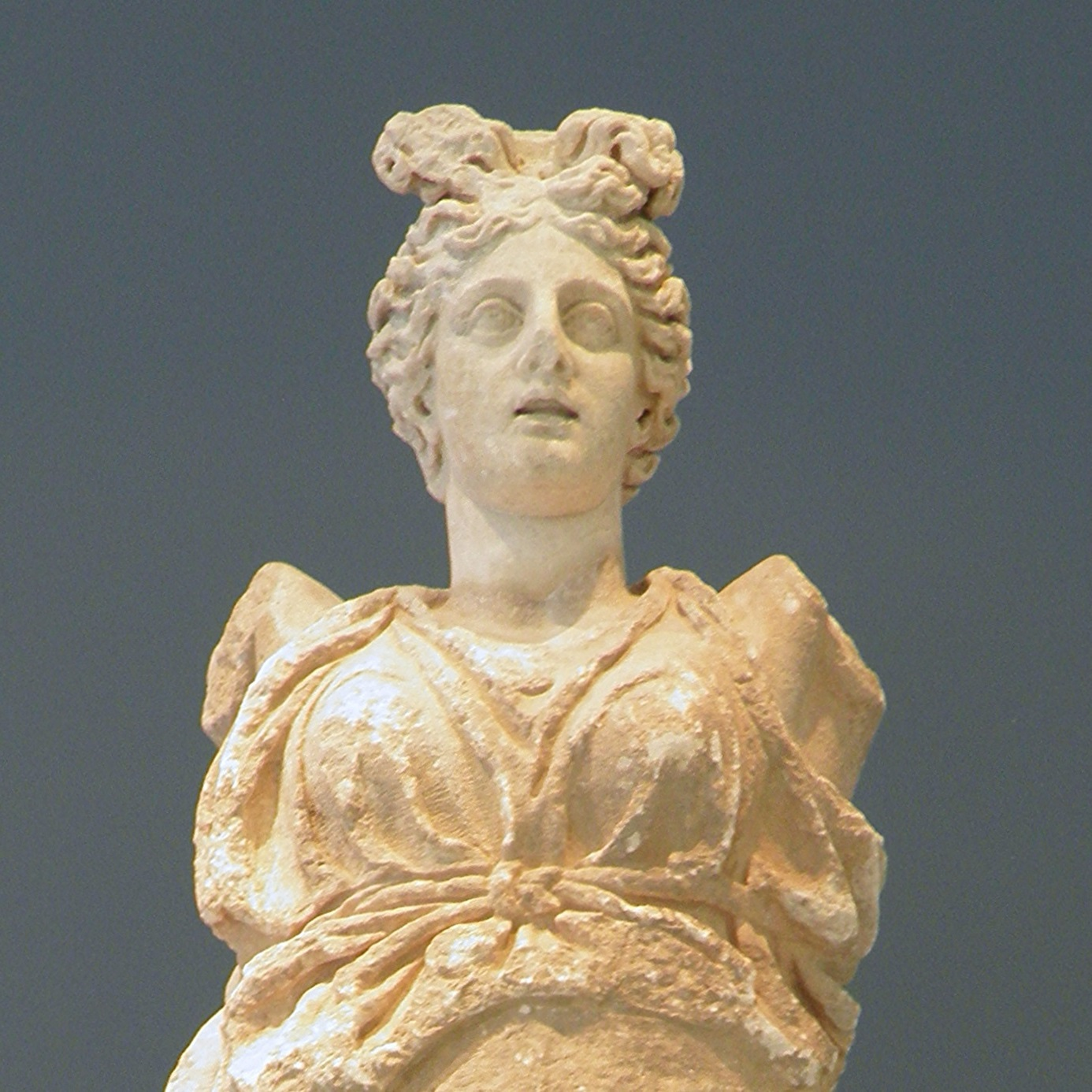
Statue of the goddess Nike from Philippi.

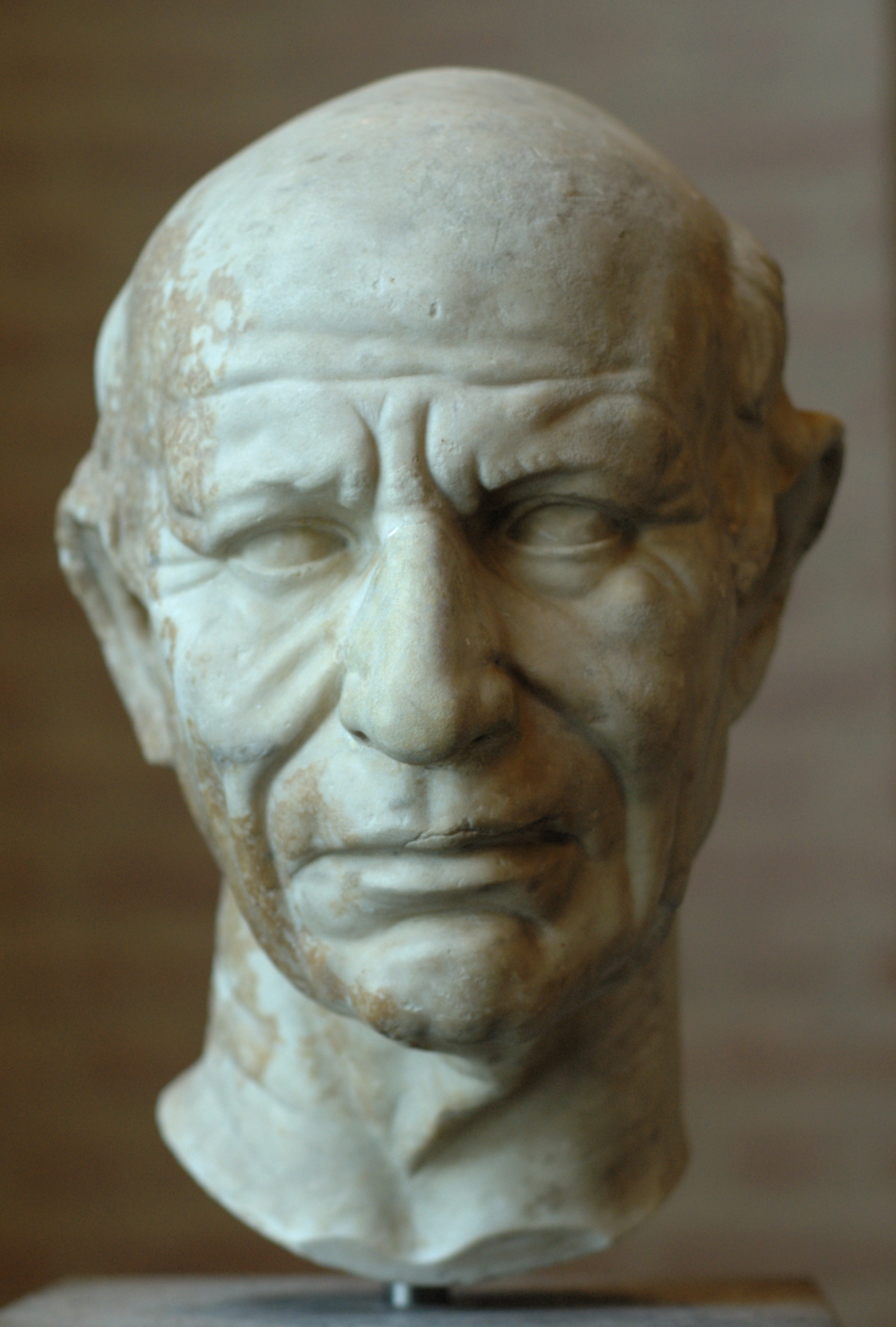
Portrait Bust of a Man, Ancient Rome, 60 BC

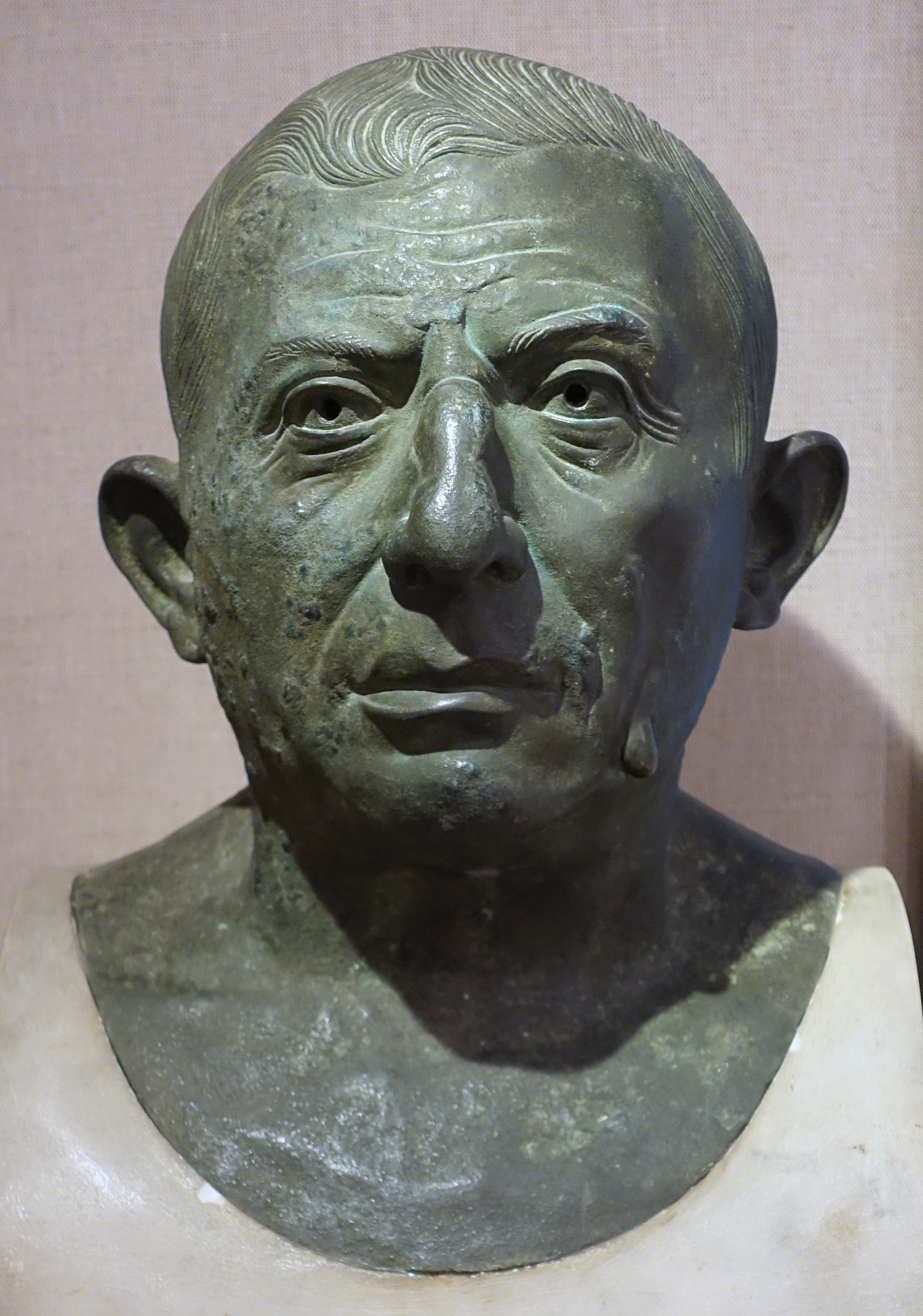
Roman portraiture is characterized by its "warts and all" realism.

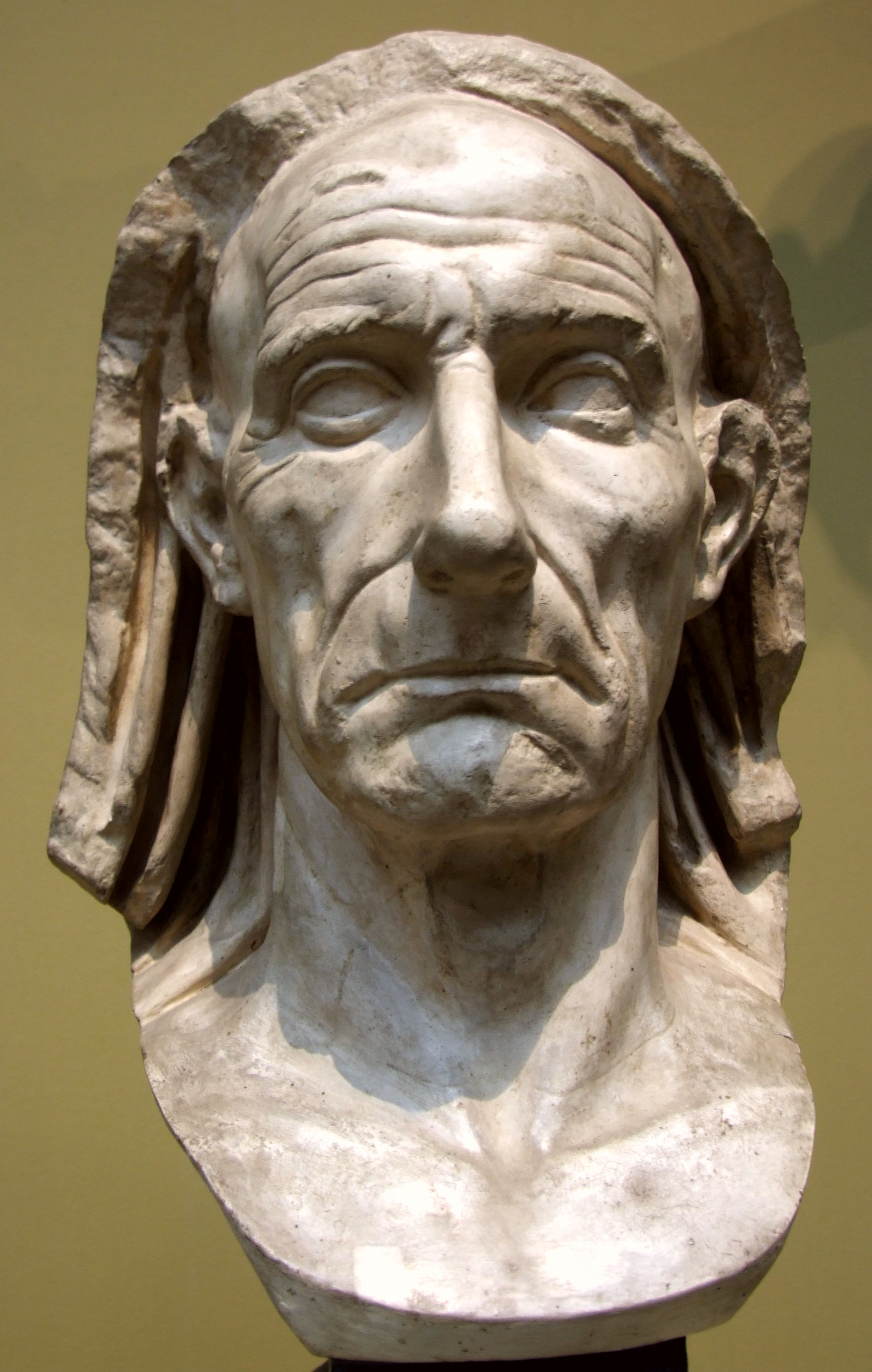
Veristic portrait bust of an old man, head covered (capite velato), either a priest or paterfamilias (marble, mid-1st century BC)

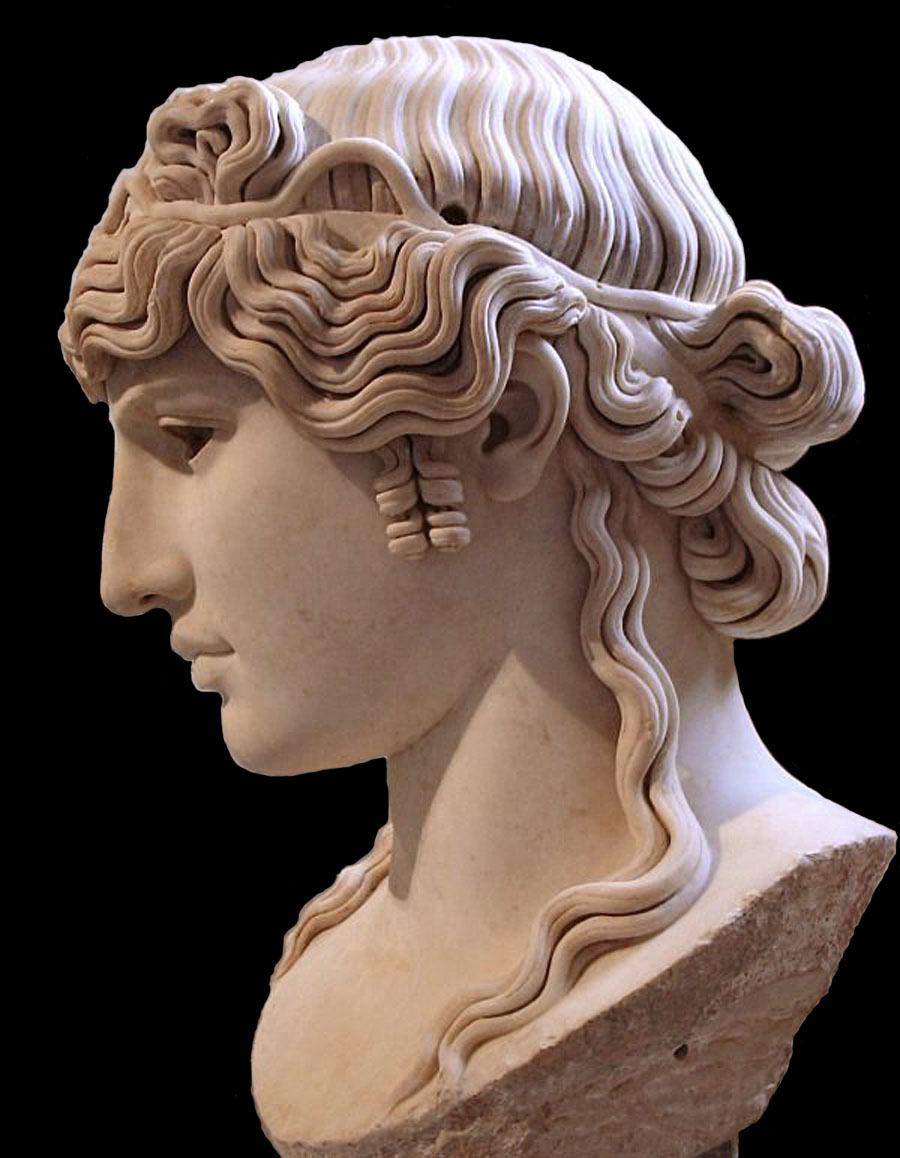
Bust of Antinous, c. 130 AD

Traditional Roman sculpture is divided into five categories: portraiture, historical relief, funerary reliefs, sarcophagi, and copies of ancient Greek works. Contrary to the belief of early archaeologists, many of these sculptures were large polychrome terra-cotta images, such as the Apollo of Veii (Villa Givlia, Rome), but the painted surface of many of them has worn away with time.

=== Narrative reliefs ===
While Greek sculptors traditionally illustrated military exploits through the use of mythological allegory, the Romans used a more documentary style. Roman reliefs of battle scenes, like those on the Column of Trajan, were created for the glorification of Roman might, but also provide first-hand representation of military costumes and military equipment. Trajan's column records the various Dacian wars conducted by Trajan in what is modern day Romania. It is the foremost example of Roman historical relief and one of the great artistic treasures of the ancient world. This unprecedented achievement, over 650 feet (200 m) of spiraling length, presents not just realistically rendered individuals (over 2,500 of them), but landscapes, animals, ships, and other elements in a continuous visual history – in effect an ancient precursor of a documentary movie. It survived destruction when it was adapted as a base for Christian sculpture. During the Christian era after 300 AD, the decoration of door panels and sarcophagi continued but full-sized sculpture died out and did not appear to be an important element in early churches.

== Decorative arts ==
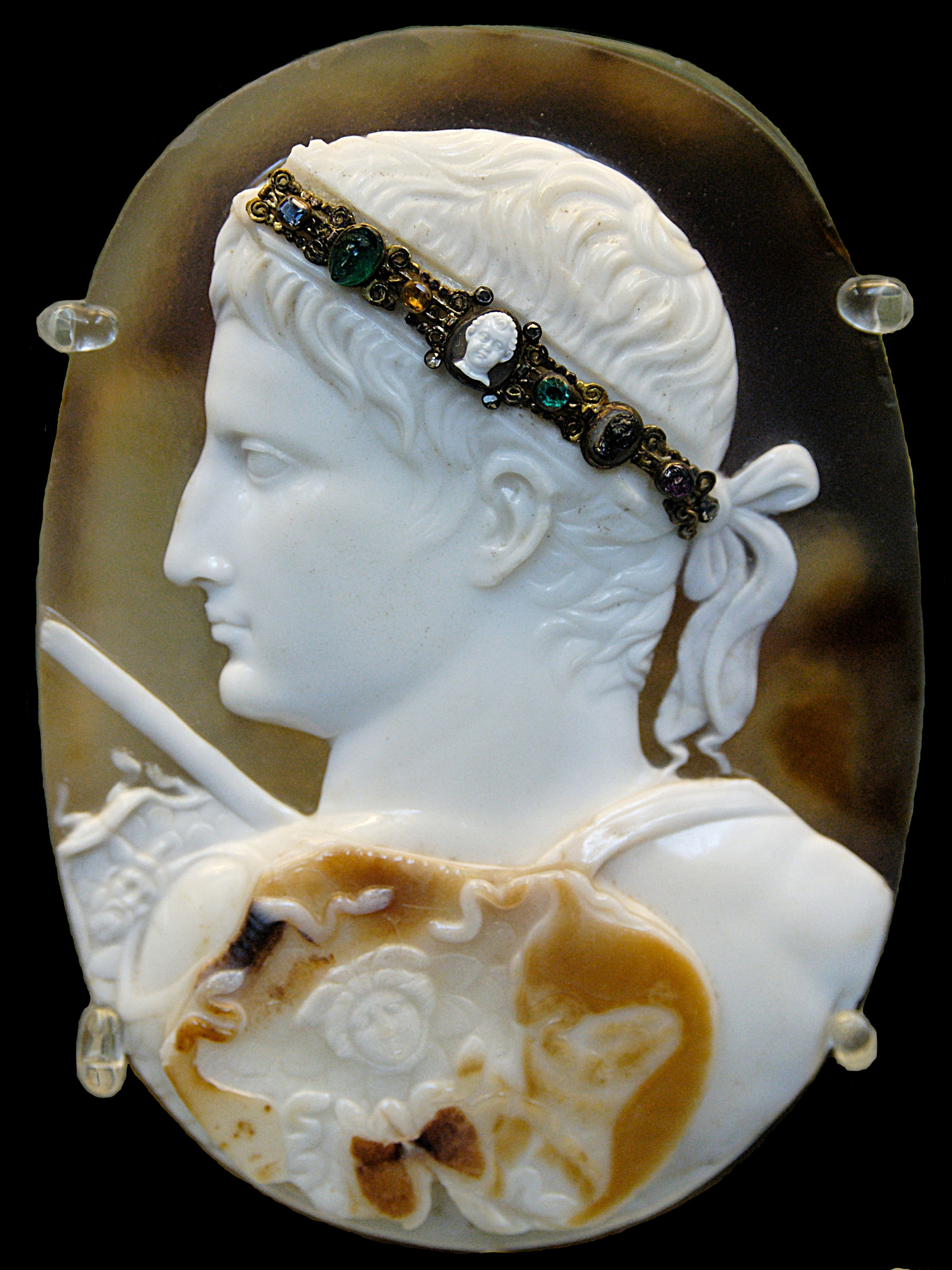
The Blacas Cameo of Augustus, from his last years or soon after

=== Pottery and terracottas ===
The Romans inherited a tradition of art in a wide range of the so-called "minor arts" or decorative art. Most of these flourished most impressively at the luxury level, but large numbers of terracotta figurines, both religious and secular, continued to be produced cheaply, as well as some larger Campana reliefs in terracotta. Roman art did not use vase-painting in the way of the ancient Greeks, but vessels in Ancient Roman pottery were often stylishly decorated in moulded relief. Producers of the millions of small oil lamps sold seem to have relied on attractive decoration to beat competitors and every subject of Roman art except landscape and portraiture is found on them in miniature.

=== Glass ===
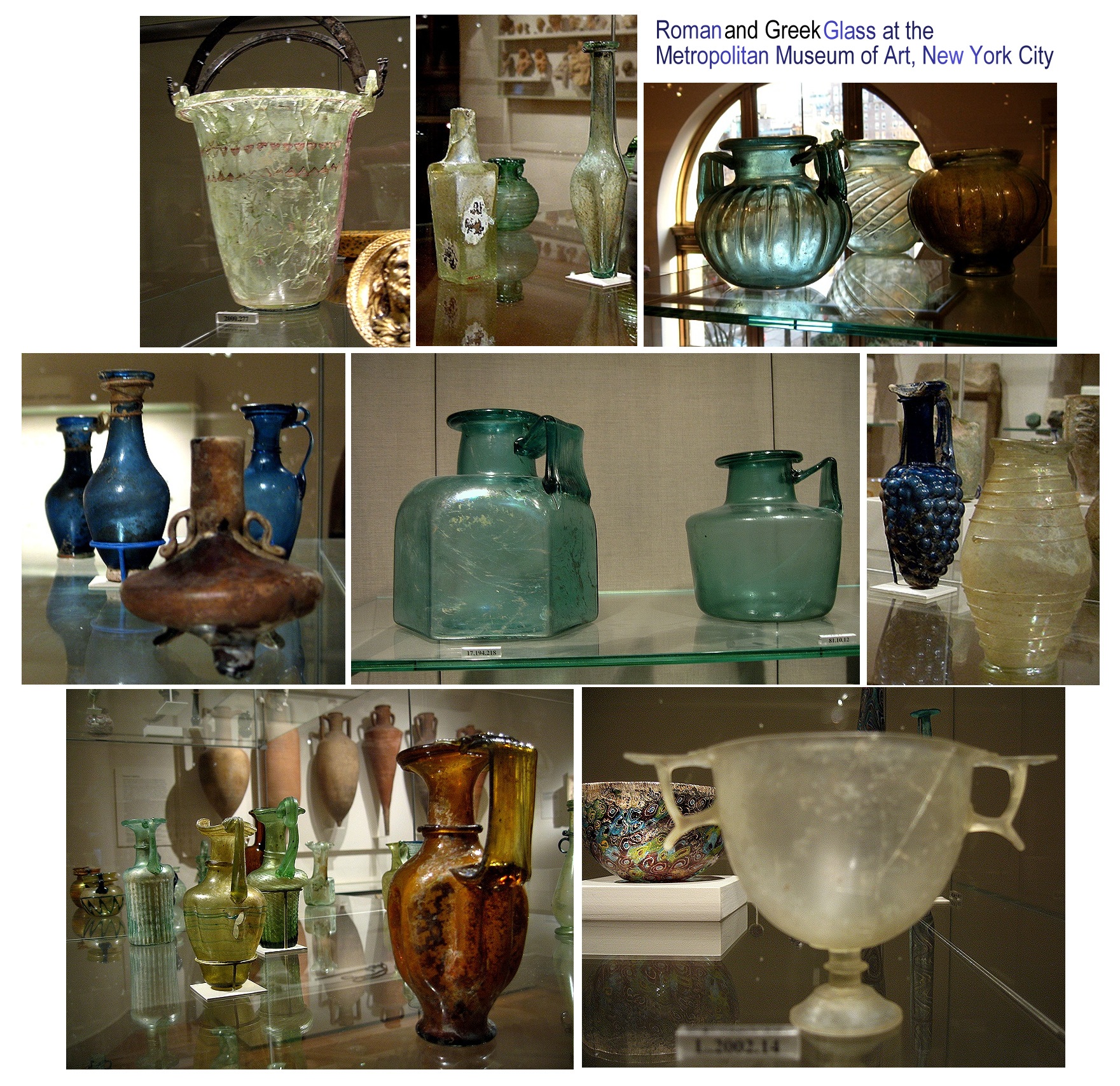
Various Roman glasswares on display at the Metropolitan Museum of Art

Luxury arts included fancy Roman glass in a great range of techniques, many smaller types of which were probably affordable to a good proportion of the Roman public. This was certainly not the case for the most extravagant types of glass, such as the cage cups or diatreta, of which the Lycurgus Cup in the British Museum is a near-unique figurative example in glass that changes colour when seen with light passing through it. The Augustan Portland Vase is the masterpiece of Roman cameo glass, and imitated the style of the large engraved gems (Blacas Cameo, Gemma Augustea, Great Cameo of France) and other hardstone carvings that were also most popular around this time.

=== Mosaic ===
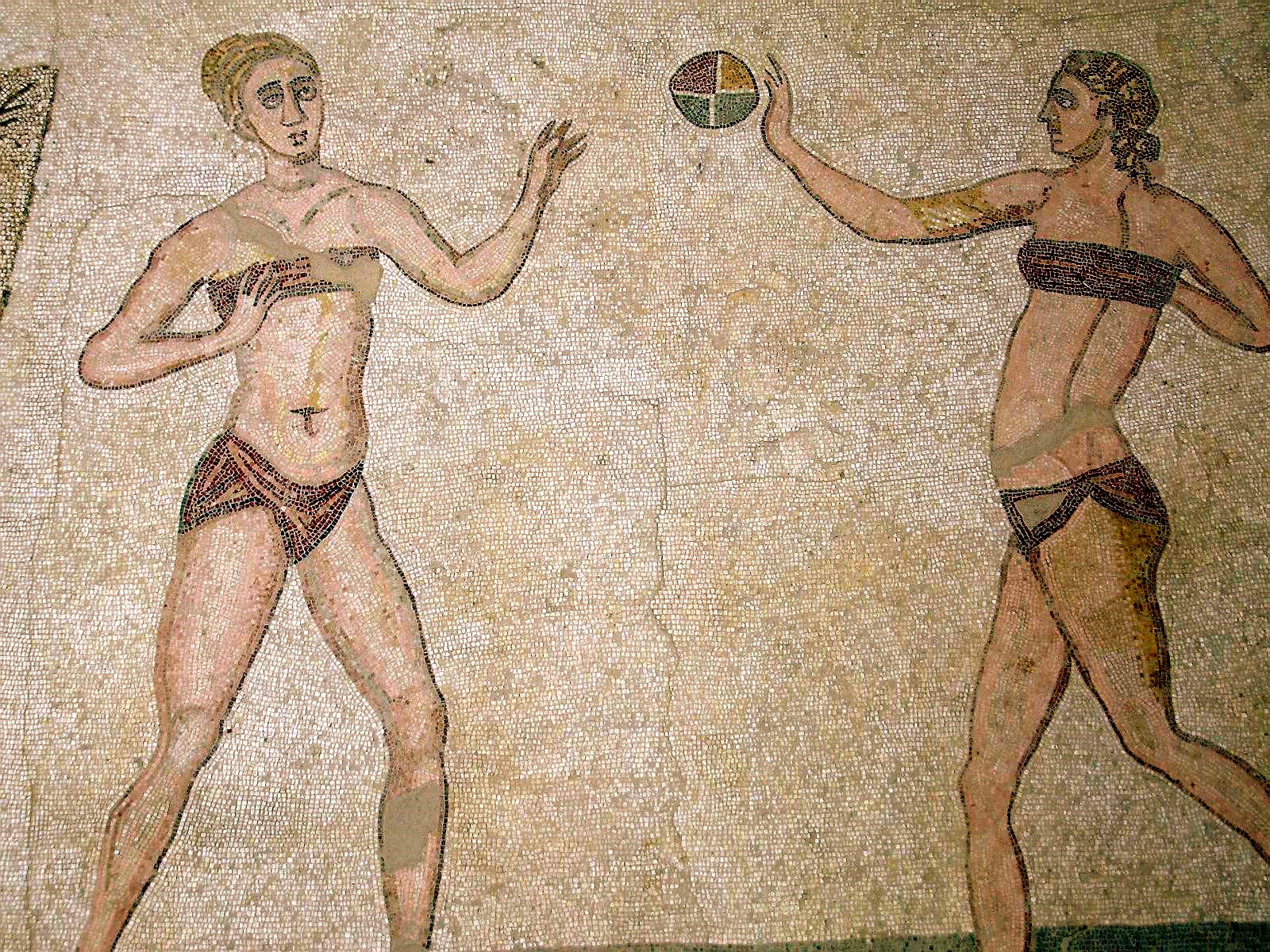
Roman mosaic of female athletes playing ball at the Villa Romana del Casale of Piazza Armerina, Roman Sicily, 4th century AD

Roman mosaic was a minor art, though often on a very large scale, until the very end of the period, when late-4th-century Christians began to use it for large religious images on walls in their new large churches; in earlier Roman art mosaic was mainly used for floors, curved ceilings, and inside and outside walls that were going to get wet. The famous copy of a Hellenistic painting in the Alexander Mosaic in Naples was originally placed in a floor in Pompeii; this is much higher quality work than most Roman mosaic, though very fine panels, often of still life subjects in small or micromosaic tesserae have also survived. The Romans distinguished between normal opus tessellatum with tesserae mostly over 4 mm across, which was laid down on site, and finer opus vermiculatum for small panels, which is thought to have been produced offsite in a workshop, and brought to the site as a finished panel. The latter was a Hellenistic genre which is found in Italy between about 100 BC and 100 AD. Most signed mosaics have Greek names, suggesting the artists remained mostly Greek, though probably often slaves trained up in workshops. The late 2nd century BC Nile mosaic of Palestrina is a very large example of the popular genre of Nilotic landscape, while the 4th century Gladiator Mosaic in Rome shows several large figures in combat. Orpheus mosaics, often very large, were another favourite subject for villas, with several ferocious animals tamed by Orpheus's playing music. In the transition to Byzantine art, hunting scenes tended to take over large animal scenes.

=== Metalwork ===
Metalwork was highly developed, and clearly an essential part of the homes of the rich, who dined off silver, while often drinking from glass, and had elaborate cast fittings on their furniture, jewellery, and small figurines. A number of important hoards found in the last 200 years, mostly from the more violent edges of the late empire, have given us a much clearer idea of Roman silver plate. The Mildenhall Treasure and Hoxne Hoard are both from East Anglia in England. There are few survivals of upmarket ancient Roman furniture, but these show refined and elegant design and execution.

=== Coins and medals ===
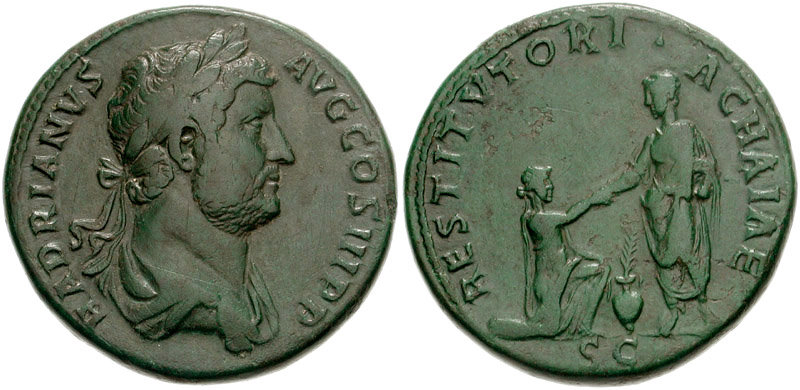
Hadrian, with "RESTITVTORI ACHAIAE" on the reverse, celebrating his spending in Achaia (Greece), and showing the quality of ordinary bronze coins that were used by the mass population, hence the wear on higher areas.

Few Roman coins reach the artistic peaks of the best Greek coins, but they survive in vast numbers and their iconography and inscriptions form a crucial source for the study of Roman history, and the development of imperial iconography, as well as containing many fine examples of portraiture. They penetrated to the rural population of the whole Empire and beyond, with barbarians on the fringes of the Empire making their own copies. In the Empire medallions in precious metals began to be produced in small editions as imperial gifts, which are similar to coins, though larger and usually finer in execution. Images in coins initially followed Greek styles, with gods and symbols, but in the death throes of the Republic first Pompey and then Julius Caesar appeared on coins, and portraits of the emperor or members of his family became standard on imperial coinage. The inscriptions were used for propaganda, and in the later Empire the army joined the emperor as the beneficiary.

== Architecture ==
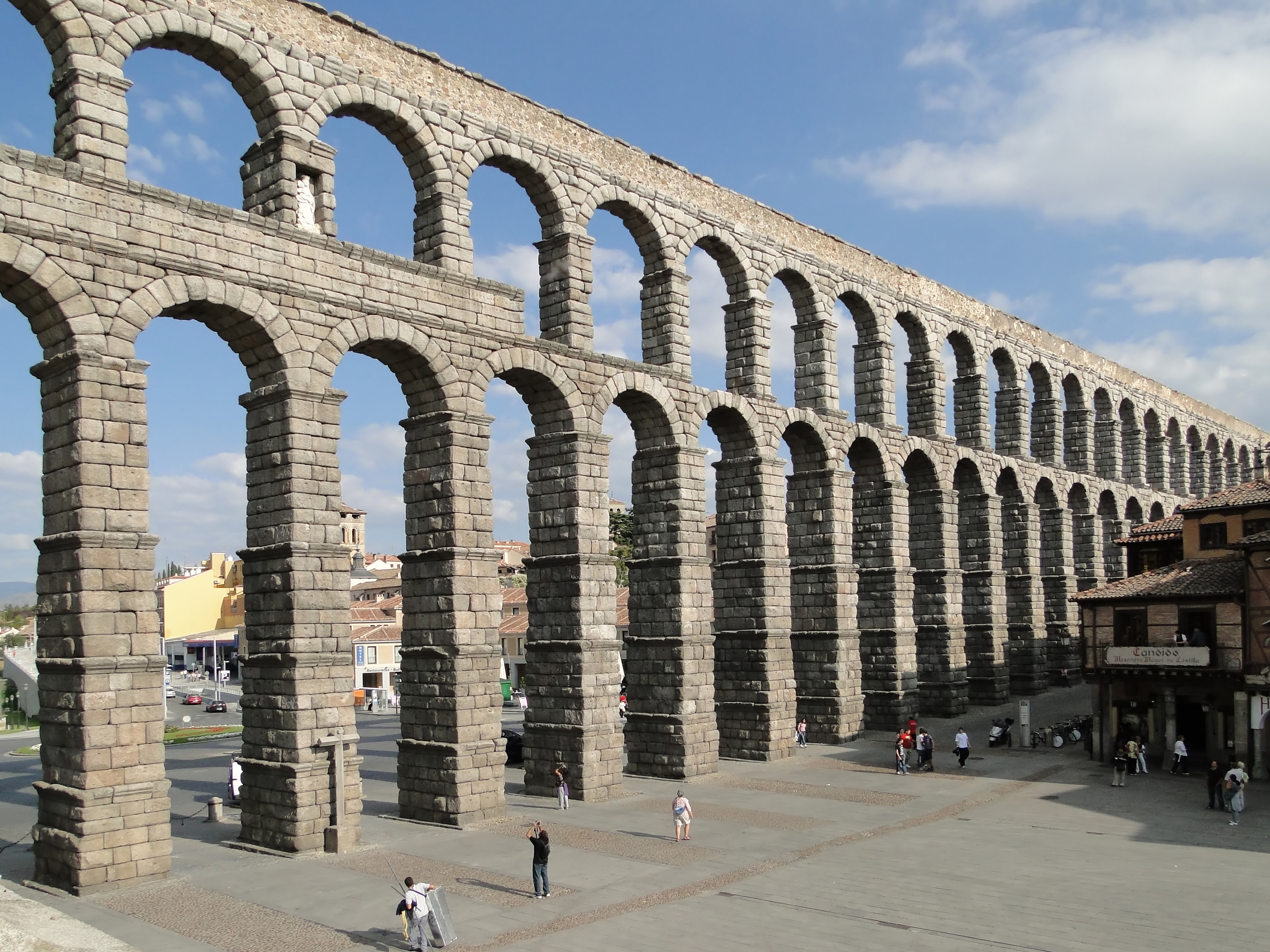
Aqueduct of Segovia

It was in the area of architecture that Roman art produced its greatest innovations. Because the Roman Empire extended over so great of an area and included so many urbanized areas, Roman engineers developed methods for citybuilding on a grand scale, including the use of concrete. Massive buildings like the Pantheon and the Colosseum could never have been constructed with previous materials and methods. Though concrete had been invented a thousand years earlier in the Near East, the Romans extended its use from fortifications to their most impressive buildings and monuments, capitalizing on the material's strength and low cost. The concrete core was covered with a plaster, brick, stone, or marble veneer, and decorative polychrome and gold-gilded sculpture was often added to produce a dazzling effect of power and wealth.

Because of these methods, Roman architecture is legendary for the durability of its construction; with many buildings still standing, and some still in use, mostly buildings converted to churches during the Christian era. Many ruins, however, have been stripped of their marble veneer and are left with their concrete core exposed, thus appearing somewhat reduced in size and grandeur from their original appearance, such as with the Basilica of Constantine.

During the Republican era, Roman architecture combined Greek and Etruscan elements, and produced innovations such as the round temple and the curved arch. As Roman power grew in the early empire, the first emperors inaugurated wholesale leveling of slums to build grand palaces on the Palatine Hill and nearby areas, which required advances in engineering methods and large scale design. Roman buildings were then built in the commercial, political, and social grouping known as a forum, that of Julius Caesar being the first and several added later, with the Forum Romanum being the most famous. The greatest arena in the Roman world, the Colosseum, was completed around 80 AD at the far end of that forum. It held over 50,000 spectators, had retractable fabric coverings for shade, and could stage massive spectacles including huge gladiatorial contests and mock naval battles. This masterpiece of Roman architecture epitomizes Roman engineering efficiency and incorporates all three architectural orders – Doric, Ionic, and Corinthian. Less celebrated but just as important if not more so for most Roman citizens, was the five-story insula or city block, the Roman equivalent of an apartment building, which housed tens of thousands of Romans.

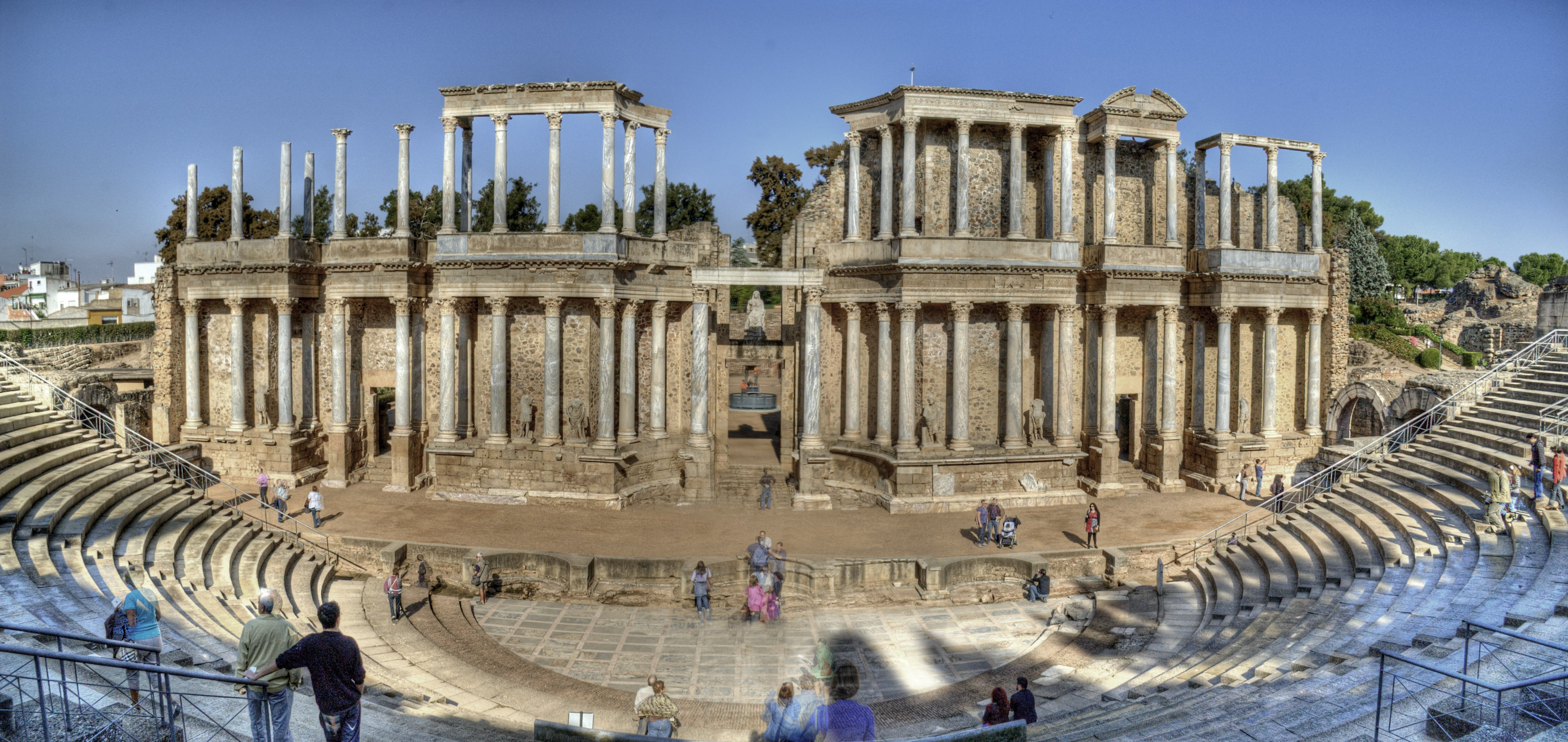
Roman theatre in Mérida

It was during the reign of Trajan (98–117 AD) and Hadrian (117–138 AD) that the Roman Empire reached its greatest extent and that Rome itself was at the peak of its artistic glory – achieved through massive building programs of monuments, meeting houses, gardens, aqueducts, baths, palaces, pavilions, sarcophagi, and temples. The Roman use of the arch, the use of concrete building methods, the use of the dome all permitted construction of vaulted ceilings and enabled the building of these public spaces and complexes, including the palaces, public baths and basilicas of the "Golden Age" of the empire. Outstanding examples of dome construction include the Pantheon, the Baths of Diocletian, and the Baths of Caracalla. The Pantheon (dedicated to all the planetary gods) is the best preserved temple of ancient times with an intact ceiling featuring an open "eye" in the center. The height of the ceiling exactly equals the interior radius of the building, creating a hemispherical enclosure. These grand buildings later served as inspirational models for architects of the Italian Renaissance, such as Brunelleschi. By the age of Constantine (306–337 AD), the last great building programs in Rome took place, including the erection of the Arch of Constantine built near the Colosseum, which recycled some stone work from the forum nearby, to produce an eclectic mix of styles.

Roman aqueducts, also based on the arch, were commonplace in the empire and essential transporters of water to large urban areas. Their standing masonry remains are especially impressive, such as the Pont du Gard (featuring three tiers of arches) and the aqueduct of Segovia, serving as mute testimony to their quality of their design and construction.

== See also ==
- Art collection in ancient Rome
- Bacchic art
- Byzantine art
- Erotic art in Pompeii and Herculaneum
- Latin literature
- Music of ancient Rome
- Neoclassicism
- Parthian art
- Pompeian Styles
- Roman graffiti
