= Cameo =

Cameo or CAMEO may refer to:

- Cameo appearance, a brief appearance of a known figure in a film or television show, metaphorically named after a cameo carving
- Cameo (carving), a method of carving, making use of layers of different colours, or an item made with such a method

== Music ==
- Cameo (album), an album by Dusty Springfield
- Cameo (band), an American funk group
- Cameo Records, a 1920s New York–based record label
- DJ Cameo, a British disc jockey and radio presenter
- "Cameo", a song by Devo from Something for Everybody
- "Cameo", a 2015 song by Momus from Turpsycore

== Places ==
- Cameo, California, a community
- Cameo, Colorado, a ghost town
- Cameo, West Virginia

== Other uses ==
- Cameo (apple), a cultivar of apple
- Cameo (coinage), a finish evaluated in the process of coin grading
- CAMEO (database), Conservation and Art Materials Encyclopedia Online, a Museum of Fine Arts, Boston database of technical terms used in art conservation and historic preservation
- CAMEO (satellite), an experiment included in the Nimbus-G launch
- Cameo (website), a website allowing users to interact with celebrities via video
- The Cameo, a 1913 French silent film
- The Cameo, Edinburgh, a cinema
- Cameo Shooting and Education Complex, a shooting and archery range in Colorado
- Computer-aided management of emergency operations, system of software applications used to plan for and respond to chemical emergencies
- Conflict and Mediation Event Observations
- EyeToy: Cameo, a system used with video games
- Cameo Theatre, a TV show
- Cameo Theater, in Miami, Florida
- Cameo Theatre (Los Angeles), in Los Angeles, California
- Kameo, a video game mechanic in Mortal Kombat 1

== See also ==
- Cameo lighting, a type of spotlight
- Cameo-Parkway Records, a 1950s and 1960s Philadelphia-based record label
- CAMEO3D (Continuous Automated Model EvaluatiOn)
- Kameo, an action-adventure video game
- Cameo Blues Band, Canadian band
