= Gemma Claudia =

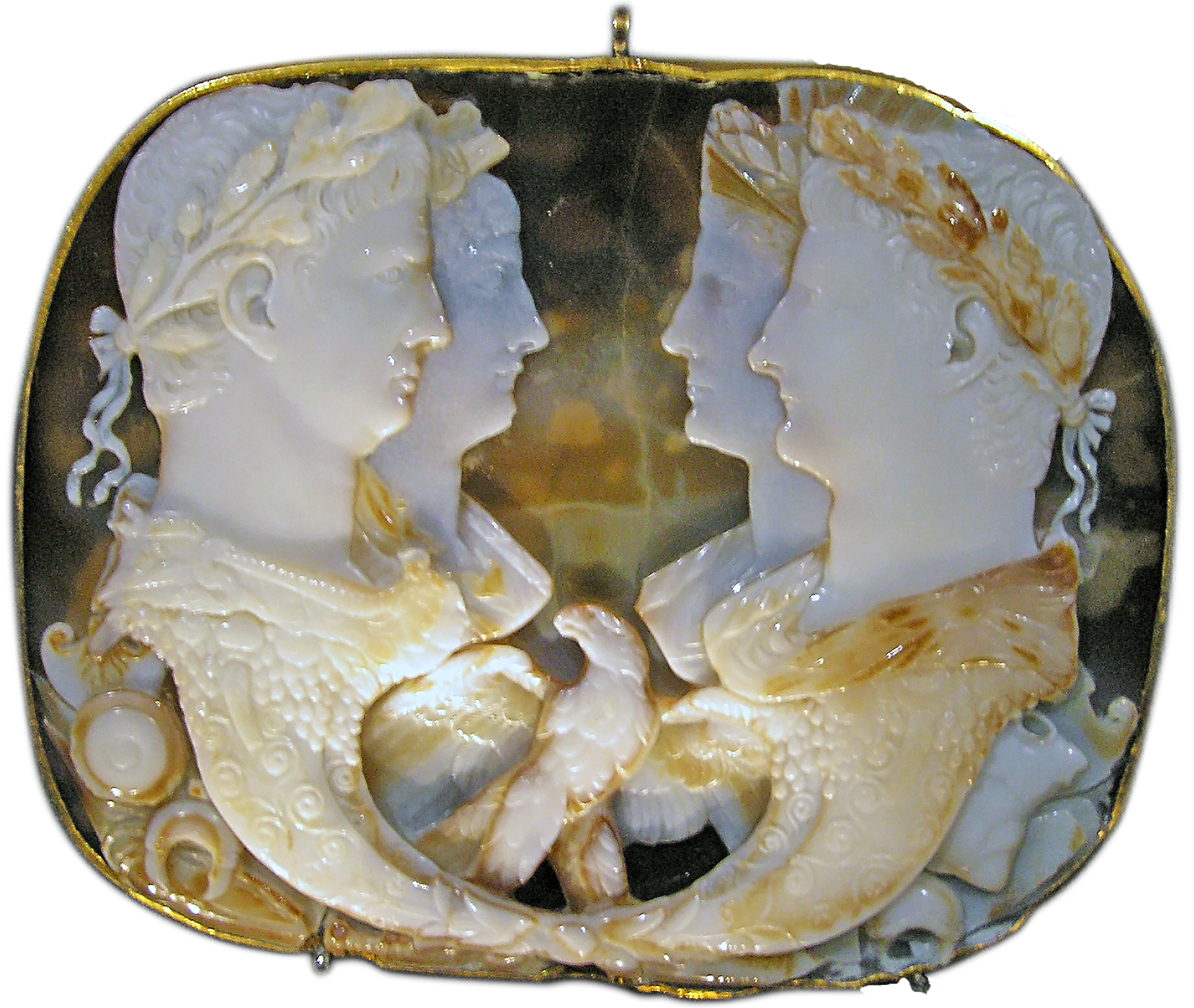
Gemma Claudia

The Gemma Claudia is a very finely carved and detailed, five-layered, cameo in sardonyx, a type of onyx that has parallel layers of sard (shades of red) which depicts members of the Roman imperial Julio-Claudian dynasty. It is believed to have been created in around 49 AD and by the 17th century was owned by the Habsburg Holy Roman Emperors, later passing to the Kunsthistorisches Museum in Vienna (AS Inv. No. IX A 63). It is 12 cm high and set in an 18th-century gold circlet.

It depicts two double cornucopia (with an eagle between), out of which sprout four portraits, two on either side. On the left is the Emperor Claudius and his new wife Agrippina the Younger (as Cybele, the goddess of fertility) opposite them, Agrippina's parents Germanicus (also Claudius's brother) and Agrippina the Elder. Both Claudius and Germanicus wear the corona civica, or civic crown, the prestigious military decoration in ancient Rome, awarded for acts of extraordinary bravery in saving the lives of fellow citizens during battle. Its date of c. 49 AD places it soon after Claudius married Agrippina in January 49, and makes it possible that it was an official marriage gift to the imperial couple.

The unknown artist carved the work from the five alternately dark and light layers of the stone with great virtuosity. They achieved an increased transparency of the material by cutting layers that in places are of unparalleled thinness (minimum 2 mm).

It is a rather late member of a group of spectacular imperial engraved gems, sometimes called "State Cameos", the earlier members of which presumably originated in the inner court circle of Augustus, as they show him with divine attributes that were still politically sensitive, and in some cases have sexual aspects that would not have been exposed to a wider audience. These include the Gemma Augustea in Vienna, the Great Cameo of France in Paris and the Blacas Cameo in London.
