= Blacas Cameo =

Large Ancient Roman cameo

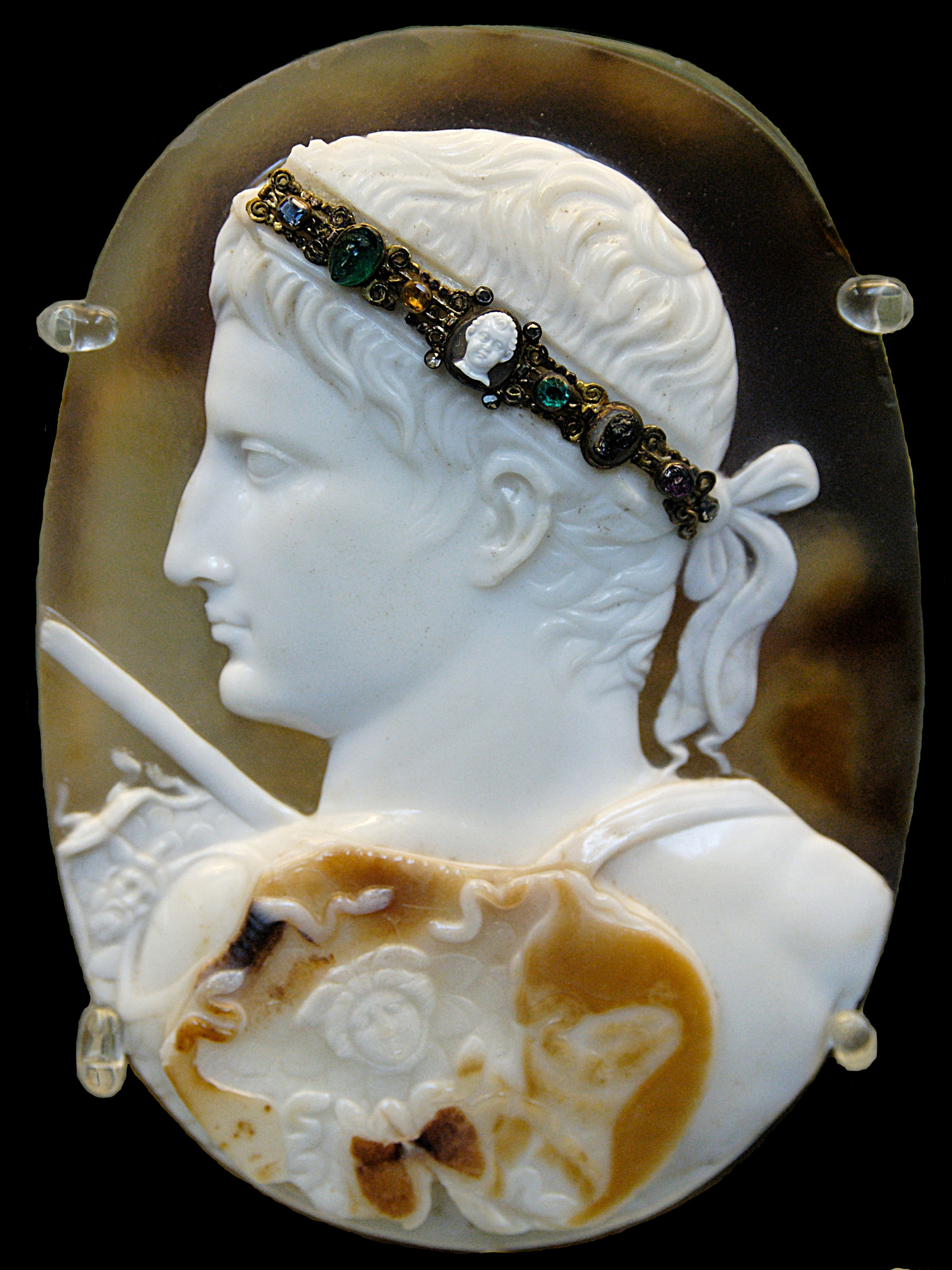
- Material: Sardonyx
- Created: 20–50 AD
- Present location: British Museum, London, UK
- Culture: Roman

The Blacas Cameo is an unusually large Ancient Roman cameo, 12.8 cm (5.0 in) high, carved from a piece of sardonyx with four alternating layers of white and brown. It shows the profile head of the Roman emperor Augustus and probably dates from shortly after his death (aged 75) in AD 14, perhaps from AD 20–50. It has been in the British Museum since 1867, when the museum acquired the famous collection of antiquities that Louis, Duke of Blacas had inherited from his father, also including the Esquiline Treasure. Normally it is on display in Room 70.

It is one of a group of spectacular imperial engraved gems, sometimes called "State Cameos", that presumably originated in the inner court circle of Augustus, as they show him with divine attributes that were still politically sensitive, and in some cases have sexual aspects that would not have been exposed to a wider audience. These include the Gemma Augustea in Vienna (which also has the Gemma Claudia showing the Emperor Claudius and his brother with their wives) and the Great Cameo of France in Paris.

== Description ==
As in all his portraiture, Augustus is depicted as a fairly young man, whose appearance is greatly idealized when compared with descriptions of him in literature. Within the very controlled conventions of his portraits, this image indicates his old age; the face has been described as "strained, ailing, yet ideal and noble", and having "a distanced air of ageless majesty". Here he is seen from behind, but with his head turned in profile, considerably over-large for the body. He has thrown the aegis, an attribute of Jupiter, over his shoulder; much of this is in the upper brown layer of the stone. The aegis is here imagined as a kind of decorated goatskin cloak with a hole for the head, which appears (improbably small) at Augustus' shoulder.

The head of the Gorgon is depicted in the white centre of the brown section, and there is another head on the other side of the aegis, shown projecting at the left. This may be Phobos, the personification of fear, who is often said in Greek literature to decorate the shields of heroes, and who Homer said appeared on the aegis. The pose and these details compare closely to a cameo in the Metropolitan Museum of Art, New York, which handles the body rather more effectively (see gallery). In New York one of the heads is interpreted as "a wind god, perhaps intended as a personification of the summer winds that brought the corn fleet from Egypt to Rome and so an oblique reference to Augustus’s annexation of Egypt after the defeat of Mark Antony and Cleopatra at Actium in 31 B.C.".

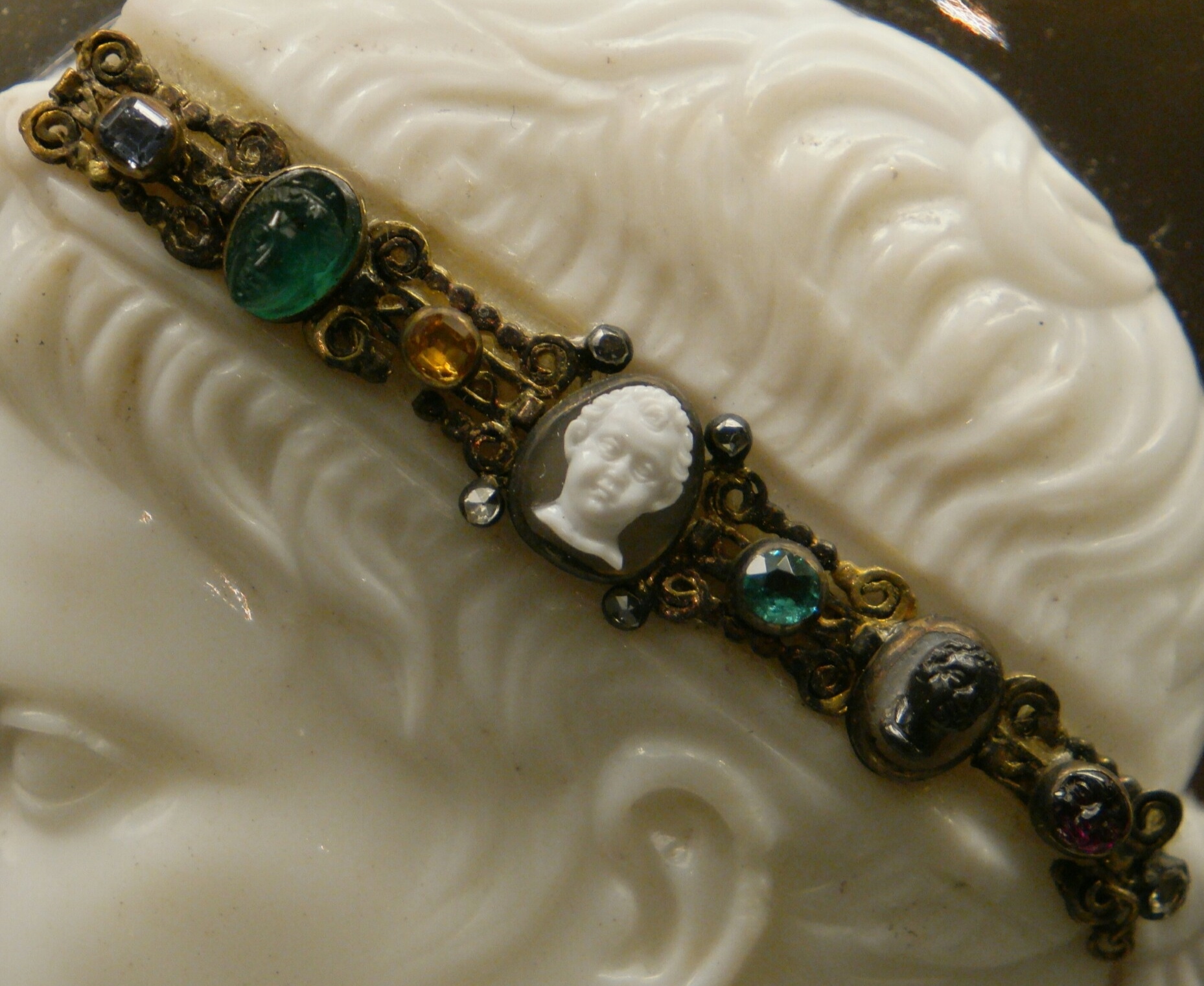
Cameo detail showing the royal diadem.

Augustus wears a royal diadem, perhaps originally just shown as the band of cloth whose ends are tied at the back of the head. The strip of gold decorated with jewels is probably medieval, and is recorded as having been repaired at the start of the 18th century, when the cameo was in the collection of Leone Strozzi, Archbishop of Florence, which is as far back as its recorded history goes. This addition may indicate that it was incorporated in a reliquary or some other medieval object, as with another cameo of Augustus used as a centrepiece for the Cross of Lothair. A staff of some kind, perhaps a sceptre or spear shaft, runs diagonally to the left, and the strap over the right shoulder is presumably for a sword at his waist. Similar poses with an aegis are found in Hellenistic art, and the intention was probably to suggest a "fighting ruler, in the tradition of Alexander the Great", who was often shown wearing the aegis. Mark Antony was also depicted wearing it.

As in other State Cameos, and Augustan monuments like the Ara Pacis, the style is strongly neo-classical and idealistic, and in contrast to the realism that marked Roman sculpture, especially in portraits. Some Roman patrician families continued to use the realist style, perhaps as a muted gesture against the Augustan Principate; the style was also used by the wealthier freedman class in their tomb monuments. In the Blacas Cameo the idealizing style is perhaps associated with one of the few Roman artists whose name we know, Dioscurides of Aegeae in Cilicia, who Pliny the Elder and Suetonius say carved Augustus's personal seal, which is now lost, though other gems apparently signed by him survive. The existence of a "State workshop" producing these gems has been inferred, probably staffed by artists of Greek origin. The cameo appears to have been cut from a larger work. The surviving "State Gems" emerge from medieval collections where they were clearly highly prized, and are presumed, like the various Late Antique consular diptychs and other ivories, to have survived above ground since antiquity.

== Gallery ==
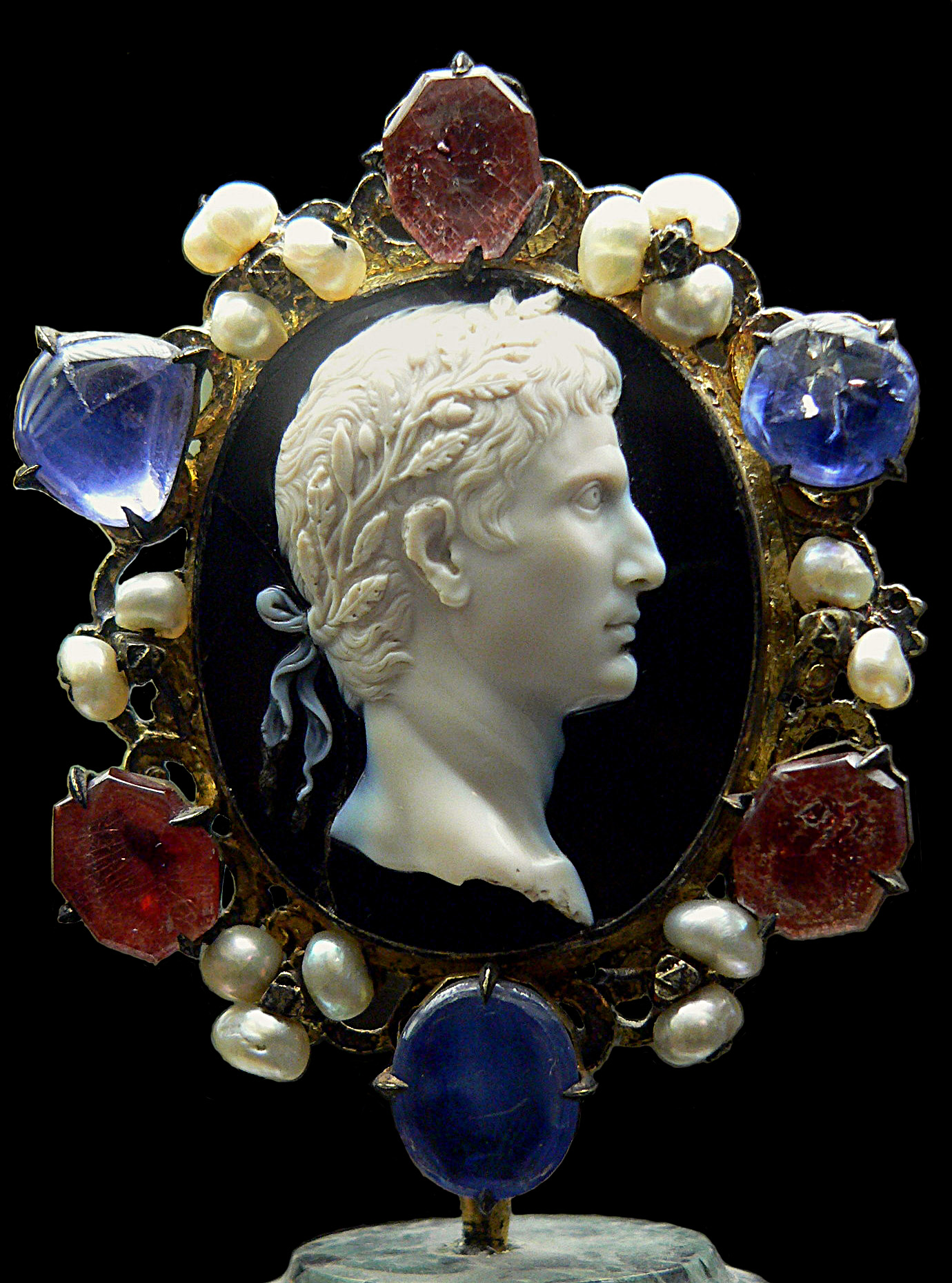
Augustus cameo, one of those attributed by some to Dioscurides, with medieval setting, from the Treasury of Saint-Denis Abbey

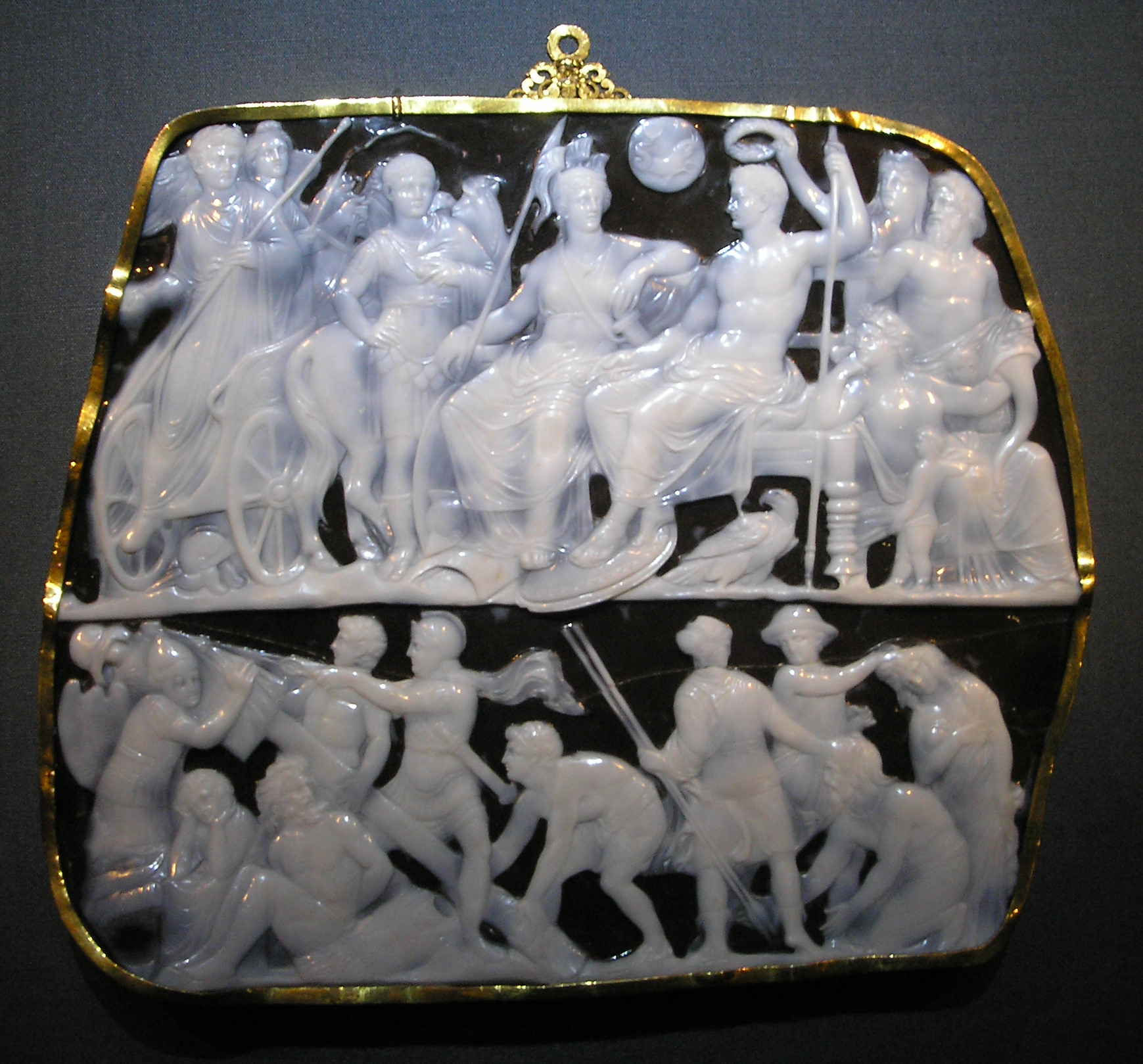
The Gemma Augustea cameo, in two layered onyx; 19 × 23 cm.

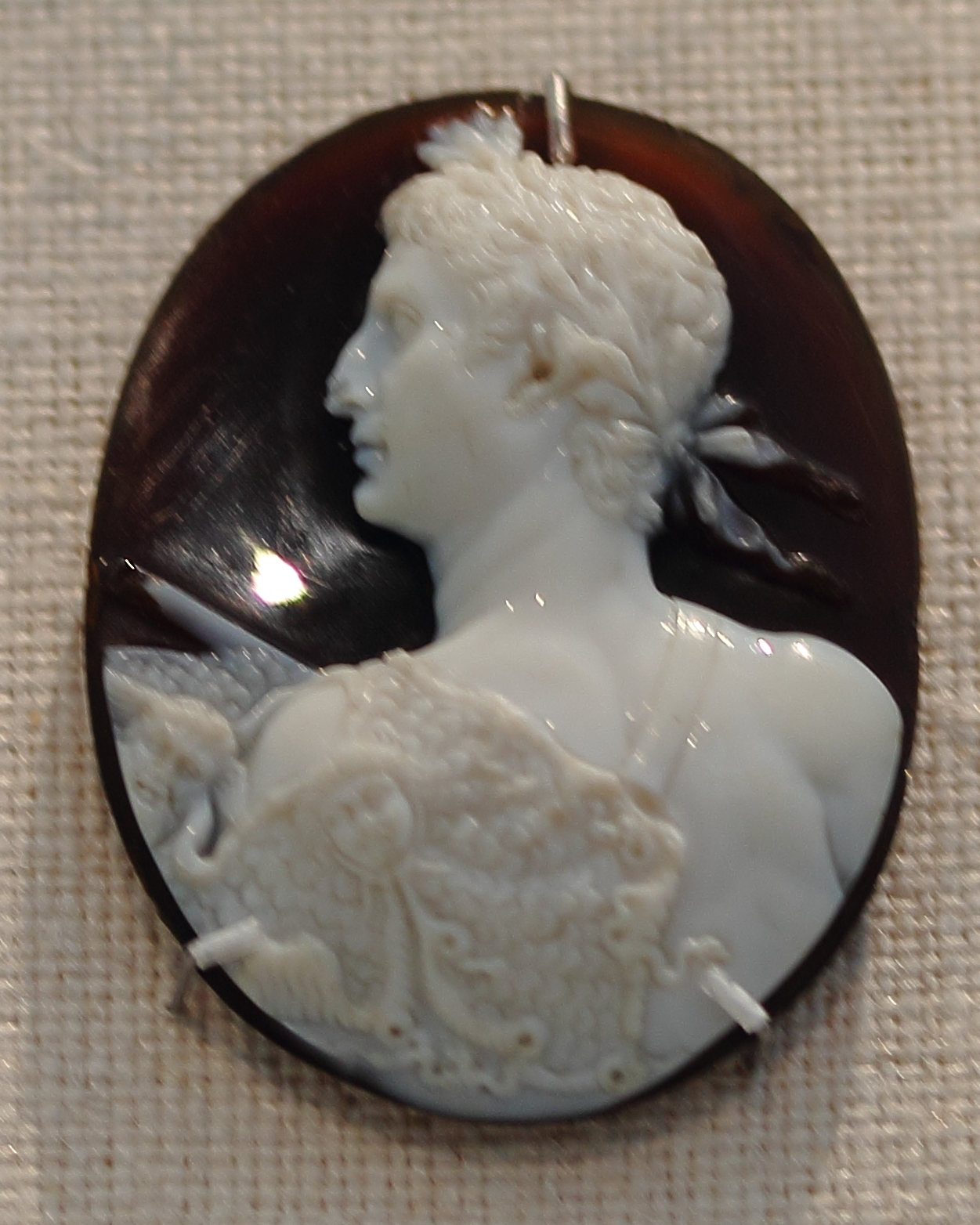
Another Augustus cameo with the aegis, Metropolitan Museum of Art

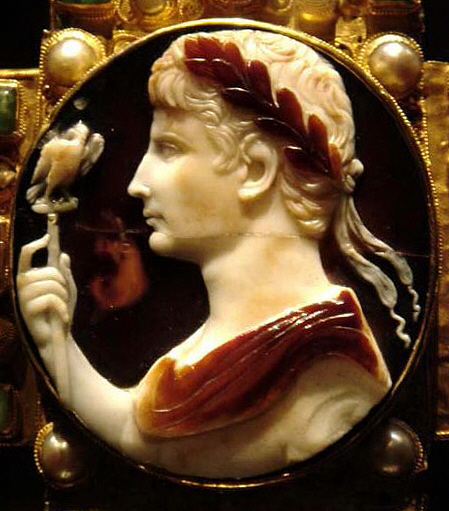
The Augustus cameo at the centre of the Cross of Lothair
