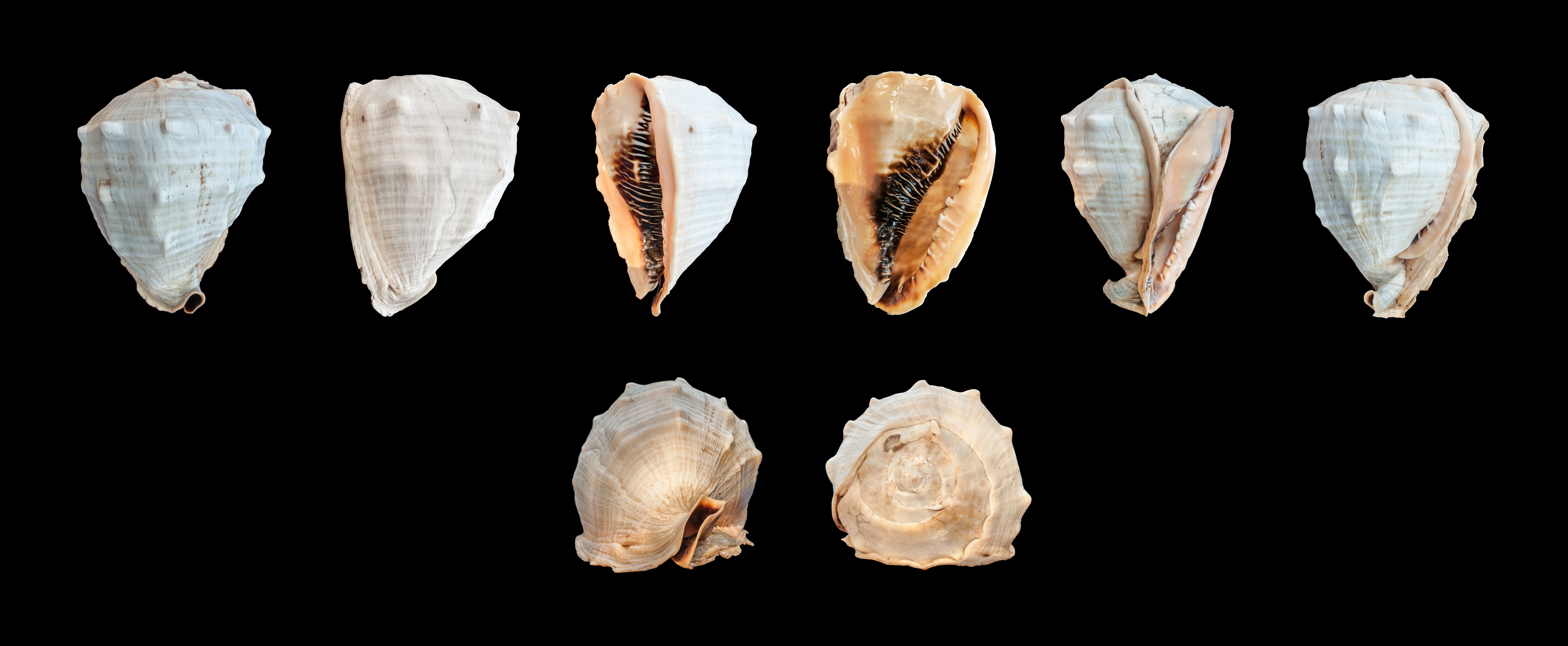

Conservation status
- Apparently Secure (NatureServe)

Scientific classification
- Kingdom: Animalia
- Phylum: Mollusca
- Class: Gastropoda
- Subclass: Caenogastropoda
- Order: Littorinimorpha
- Family: Cassidae
- Genus: Cassis
- Species: C. madagascariensis

Binomial name
- Cassis madagascariensis Lamarck, 1822

Synonyms
- Cassis (Cassis) madagascariensis Lamarck, 1822; Cassis cameo Stimpson, 1860; Cassis madagascariensis f. spinella Clench, 1944; Cassis madagascariensis spinella Clench, 1944; Cassis madagascariensis var. major Rigacci, 1866; Cassis madagascariensis var. minor Rigacci, 1866; Cassis rotundata Perry, 1811

= Cassis madagascariensis =

Species of gastropod

Cassis madagascariensis, (queen helmet, emperor helmet, or cameo helmet), is a marine gastropod mollusc in the family Cassidae, the helmet shells and bonnet shells. It is known as the largest species of its family in the Atlantic Ocean.

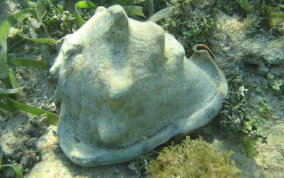
Emperor/Queen Helmet Snail in the wild.

== Distribution ==
This species inhabits the tropical Western Atlantic, the Gulf of Mexico and the Caribbean Sea. The name "madagascarensis" means "of Madagascar", but this was a misunderstanding of the type locality by the original author.

== Description ==
The maximum recorded shell length is 409 mm. The organism has no vertebra. It has a large, heavy shell, with a short spire. This shell typically has three rows of blunt knobs and smaller lines of spiral folds. It has an elongated aperture with folds on both sides of the inner aperture. This shell color varies from white to tan and may have brown markings and blotches. The species of Cassis Madagascariensis (Queen Helmet Mollusk) can be distinguished by their size and the number of spines on their shell. C. Madagascariensis Lamark can be identified more easily. This is because it has fewer and larger spines than most other species. The topmost spine is notably larger than the rest of the spines.

== Human uses ==
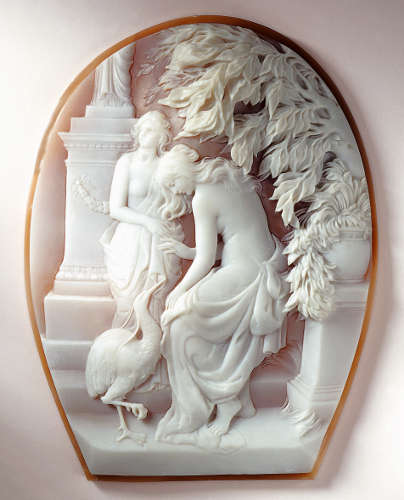
Cameo by Ascione manufacture, 1925, Naples, Coral and Cameo Jewellery Museum.

Shells are used in jewellery to make cameos. In the Maldives the shell is boiled and the boiled water is used as a traditional remedy for flu and fever.
