= Cameo, Colorado =

Ghost town in Mesa County, Colorado, USA

- ghost town
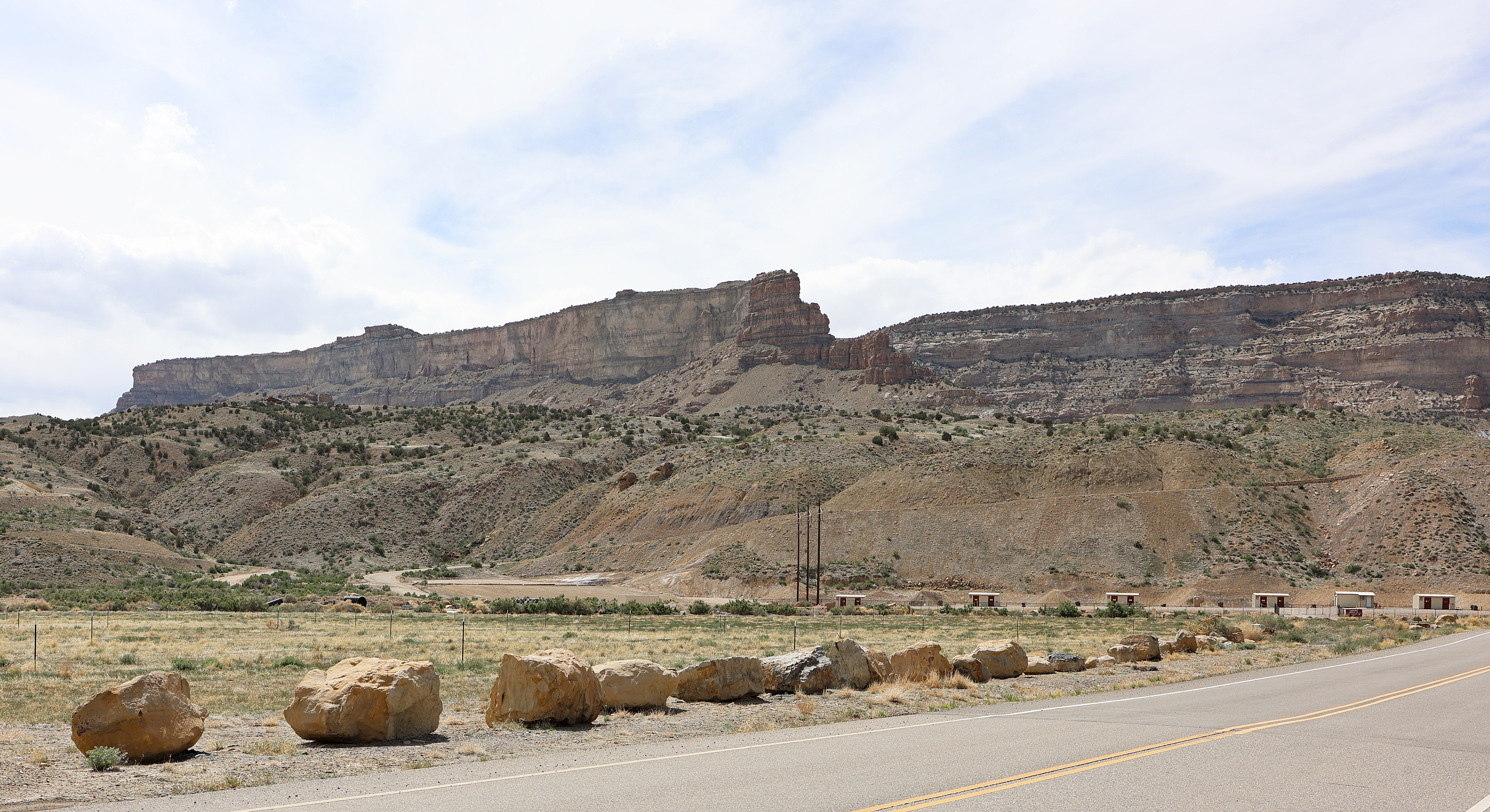
- The townsite (left side of picture) in 2025

- Location of Cameo, Colorado. Cameo (Colorado)
- Coordinates: 39°08′55″N 108°19′15″W
- Country: United States
- State: Colorado
- County: Mesa
- Elevation: 4,787 ft (1,459 m)
- Time zone: UTC−07:00 (MST)
  - Summer (DST): UTC−06:00 (MDT)
- GNIS pop ID: 174435

Cameo is an extinct coal mining town located in Mesa County, Colorado, United States. The townsite is located off I-70 Exit 46.

== History ==
The Cameo post office operated from December 14, 1907, until February 28, 1969. The community was named for a cameo-like formation near the original town site. The townsite was the location of a coal mine and a coal-fired power plant until both were decommissioned in the early 21st century. The former town is now the location of the Cameo Shooting and Education Complex, established in 2018.

== See also ==
- List of ghost towns in Colorado
