= LandView =

LandView was a public domain GIS viewer designed to display United States Census Bureau, Environmental Protection Agency (USEPA), and U.S.Geological Survey (USGS) data. The last available version was LandView 6.

LandView is related to the CAMEO system (Computer-aided Management of Emergency Operations), in that they share the same mapping program (MARPLOT).
