= Schaffhausen onyx =

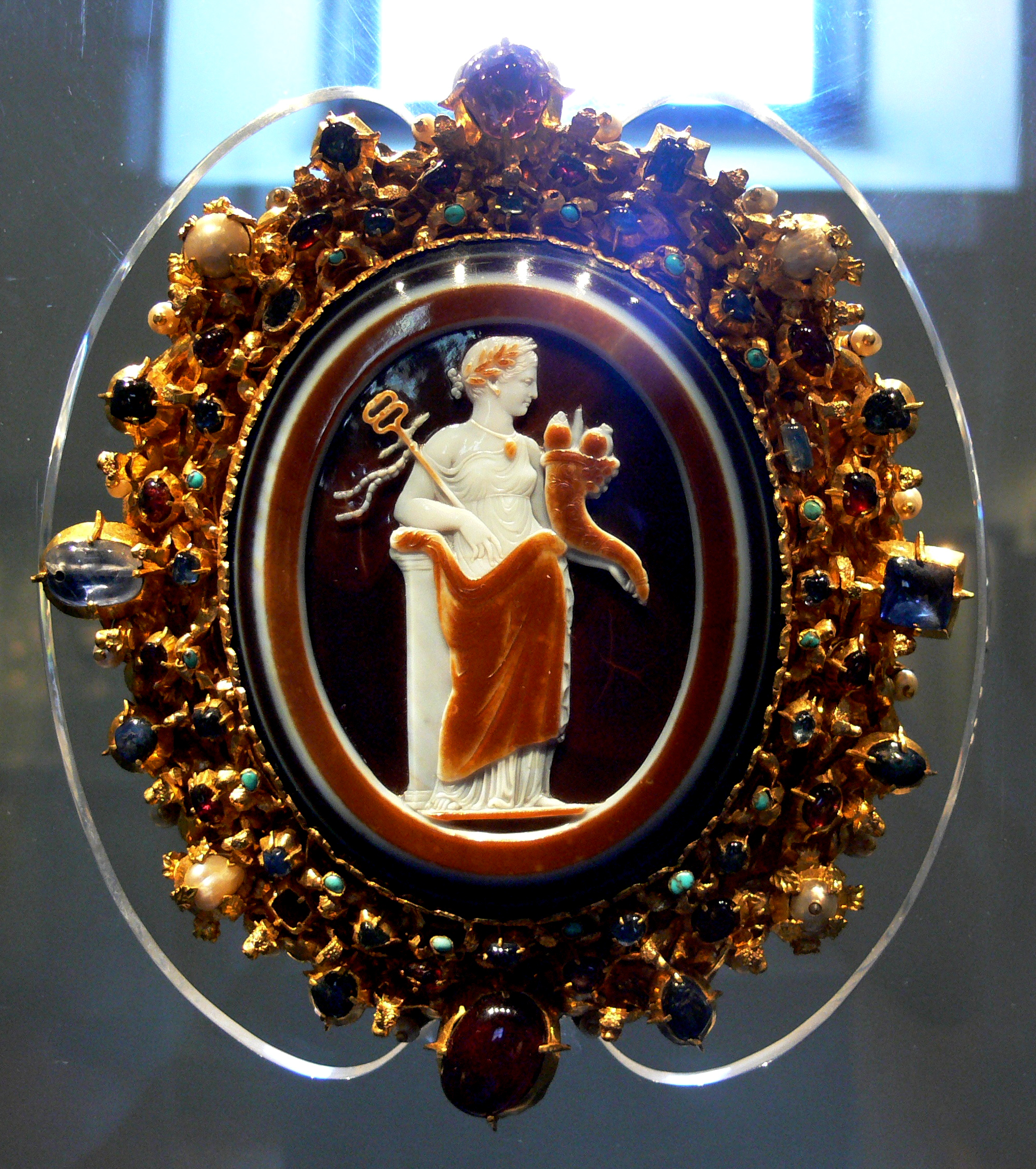
The Schaffausen onyx

The Schaffhausen onyx is an ancient cameo, one of the most important Augustan-era hardstone carvings and now one of the highlights on display in the Museum zu Allerheiligen in Schaffhausen, Switzerland. In the 13th century, the cameo was given an ornate gold and silver setting as well as a medallion on the reverse.

The oval, engraved 9.5 by 8 cm (3.7 by 3.1 in) high relief depicts a goddess, either Pax Augusta or perhaps Felicitas, standing barefoot and leaning against a plinth with a cornucopia in her left arm and a caduceus in her right. Pax Augusta symbolizes peace in the Roman Empire, while Felicitas embodies luck and prosperity. She wears a jewel around her neck and a wreath of laurel and oak leaves on her head. In Roman religious symbolism, these insignia stand for victory and the saving of citizens' lives (see corona civica).

The whole stone piece, measuring 15.5 by 13 cm (6.1 by 5.1 in), is now dated to the first half of the 1st century CE, while the setting is thought to have been made around 1240. It is carved from layered sardonyx, a variety of quartz. The relief image has been carved from three differently coloured layers (dark-light-dark). The blue and brown onyx was probably originally worn as a brooch. Traces of fittings for this can be seen on the back of the gemstone.

It has the museum inventory number 16375 and is located in the middle of the Kreuzsaal on the 2nd floor of the north wing. Before a renovation of the permanent collection in 2010, it was displayed in the "Treasure Chamber" of Michaelskapelle in the choir area.

== Description ==
=== The cameo ===
The figure's face is in profile, with her head and eyes turned slightly downward and her short hair pulled back. She wears a sheer, floor-length dress girt under her bust with her right shoulder bare. A heavier cloth garment is draped around her hips and held in place by her right arm on the plinth.

The cameo has a later gold setting with 54 gems, semi-precious stones and also pearls; these are mainly sapphire, turquoise, garnet and lapis lazuli, of which three are missing. From certain angles, several figures of eagles and lions can be seen in the gold rim.

It is noticeable that the edging with gemstones was done very evenly. There are four similar stones in each quarter arc of the rosette, resulting in a total of 16 pieces. Three such inner rows thus total 48 pieces, while the outer wreath alternately holds different stones, also for a total of 16 pieces. In addition, there are 16 small beads alternately placed in each case.

=== The falconer medallion ===
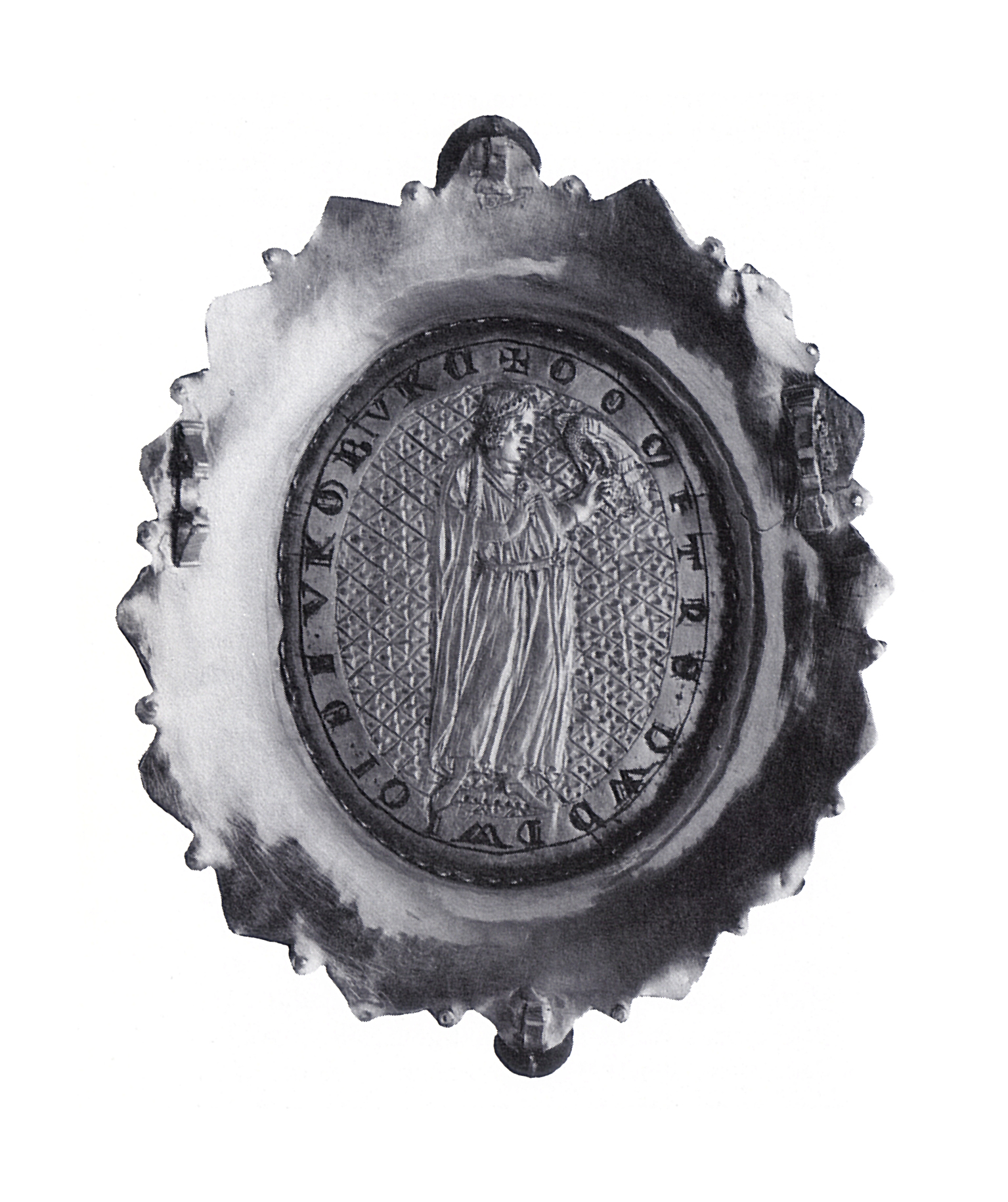
The silver falconer in silver on the reverse

The back consists of a silver-gilt plate, on which a standing figure, possibly a knight, was engraved "in a long, pleated house dress with cloak and breastplate, a floral wreath on the head and a falcon on the gloved left hand". The background is filled with rhombus and cross devices. The inscription reads ✠COMITIS LVDIWICI DE VROBURC, or '(possession) of Count Ludwig of Froburg', with the initial cross as an invocation. The text starts at the top and runs clockwise around the falconer, with a cap height of 5–6 millimetres (0.20–0.24 in). This text was probably altered in the 16th century, under circumstances to disguise ownership. The changes were made by changing the existing capital letters by additional lines to other letters, which, however, makes no sense. The modified text is ✠OOMETRS DWDDIWIOI DE VKOBUKO. Nevertheless, the original lettering can be reconstructed quite well.

The representation as a falconer would suit Frederick II, whose territory included Sicily, because he owned falcons and wrote the book De arte venandi cum avibus ('On the art of hunting with birds'), but probably depicts Count Louis (or Ludwig) III or his son, Count Louis IV. It is also possible that the engravings were the work of successive generations: the falconer as the oldest design element would then have emerged under Emperor Frederick II, and the inscription under Count Louis III or IV. In this case, the person depicted might represent the then owner Frederick II, despite the inscription's implication that it was the likeness of one of the two Counts.

The seals used by Louis III (died 1256/1259) and Louis IV use the same design but with the additional word SIGILLVM.

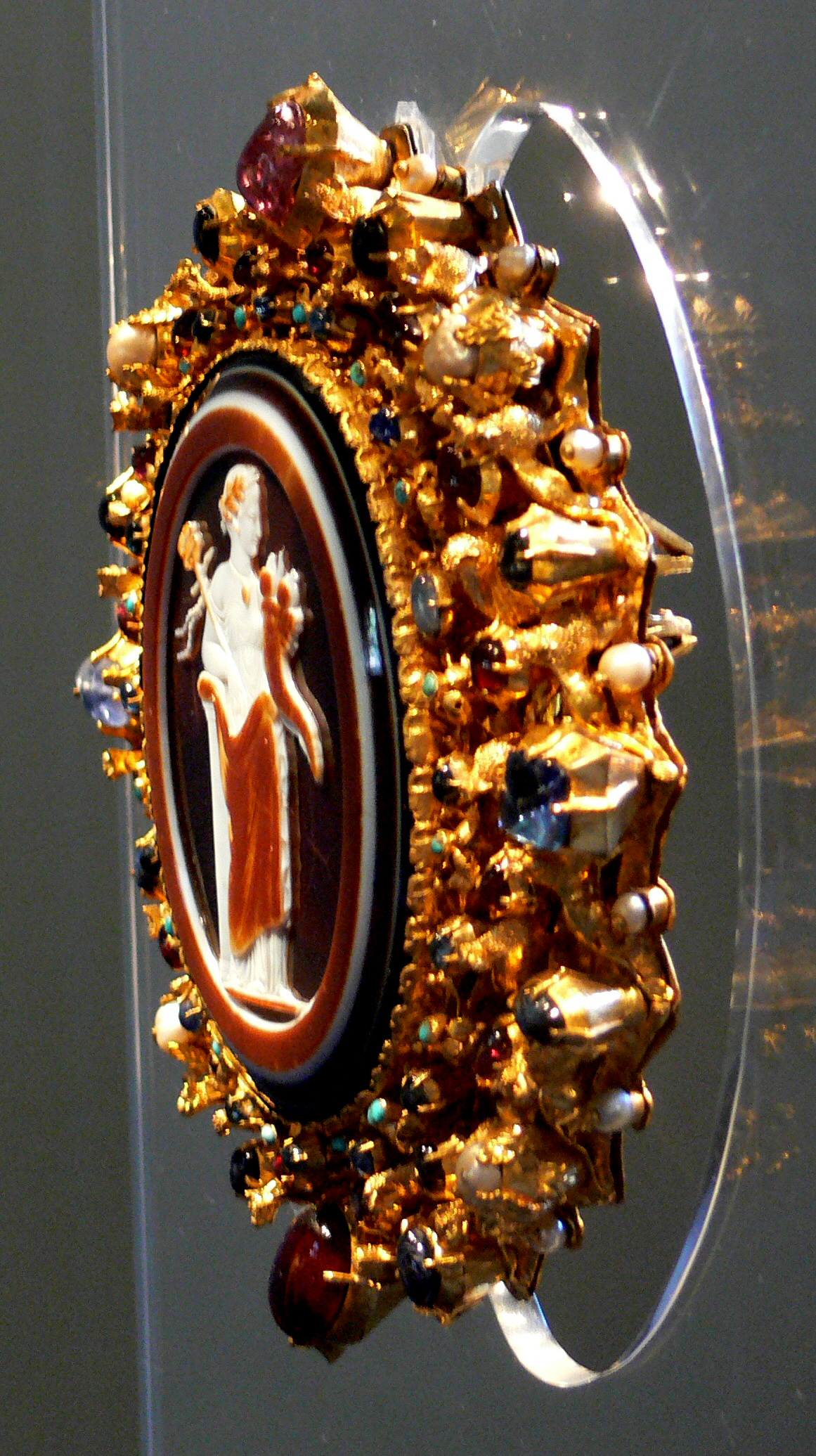
Side view of the setting

== Ownership history ==
It is now impossible to determine the origin or the artist of the cameo, or the way in which the gemstone came into the possession of Frederick II, the earliest owner currently known. Frederick II had extensive possessions and a lively interest in art. According to Kettler, the gold setting was possibly added in a Strasbourg workshop, a sign of the esteem in which such antiquities were then held.

According to Knoepfli, Louis III or Louis IV of Frohburg called as another owner. The Bildindex der Kunst und Architektur considers it "booty from the Battle of Grandson". In 1279, the cameo—including the gold mount and the engraving on the back—came into the possession of the widow of Henry III, Herr von Rappoltstein, by gift or inheritance. She entered the convent of Paradies near Schaffhausen that same year.

With the Reformation, the convent's treasures and archives, including the cameo, passed into municipal ownership. It can be traced in the city's archives starting in 1616 with the description Ein Goldin Klainot mit Edelgestainen Versetz N.N. genandt ('a gold jewel with a precious stone setting named N.N.'); starting in 1740 it is referred to simply as "Onyx". In 1799, the historian Johannes von Müller kept it in his writing desk. With the loss of Schaffhausen's city status, the onyx came into the possession of the canton and was housed in the state archives. Despite several attractive purchase inquiries, it was not sold and has been on permanent loan in the exhibition of the Museum zu Allerheiligen since 1928. Since then, it has left the museum only for the Holy Roman Empire exhibit in the Kunsthistorisches Museum Magdeburg in 2006.

== Assessment ==
The jewel belongs squarely in the tradition of Greek and Roman craftsmanship. Over many centuries, similar representations can be found, which differ only slightly from each other. The technique of engraving cameos, probably originating from the Arab world, was adopted and varied by ancient artisans. In place of agate, they later used other layered stones, which, when worked in the right position, produce haunting works of art in the smallest of spaces.

The goldsmith's work, probably from a Strasbourg workshop, is comparable to many other pieces of this time, both in terms of equipment and craftsmanship. It may be compared to works of sacred art as well as to the so-called Wettinger Prachtkreuz or processional cross from the abbey of Wettingen-Mehrerau, which has the same external decoration.

== Further references ==
- Heuser, Hans-Jörgen (1974). Oberrheinische Goldschmiedekunst im Hochmittelalter. Berlin: Deutscher Verein für Kunstwissenschaft. ISBN 978-3-87157-041-4.
- Oeri, Johann Jakob (1882). Der Onyx von Schaffhausen. Jubiläums-Schrift des Historisch-antiquarischen Vereins Schaffhausen. Zürich: J. J. Hofer Verlag.
- Vollenweider, Marie-Louise (1971). "Der Onyx in Schaffhausen". Helvetia Archaeologica. 2: 78–89.
