= Computer-aided management of emergency operations =

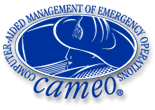

CAMEO is a system of software applications used widely to plan for and respond to chemical emergencies. It is one of the tools developed by EPA’s Office of Emergency Management (OEM) and the National Oceanic and Atmospheric Administration Office of Response and Restoration (NOAA), to assist front-line chemical emergency planners and responders. They can use CAMEO to access, store, and evaluate information critical for developing emergency plans. In addition, CAMEO supports regulatory compliance by helping users meet the chemical inventory reporting requirements of the Emergency Planning and Community Right-to-Know Act (EPCRA, also known as SARA Title III). CAMEO also can be used with a separate software application called LandView to display EPA environmental databases and demographic/economic information to support analysis of environmental justice issues.

The CAMEO system integrates a chemical database and a method to manage the data, an air dispersion model, and a mapping capability. All modules work interactively to share and display critical information. The CAMEO system is available in Macintosh and Windows formats.

== Origin ==
CAMEO initially was developed because NOAA recognized the need to assist first responders with easily accessible and accurate response information. Since 1988, EPA and NOAA have collaborated to augment CAMEO to assist both emergency responders and planners. CAMEO has been enhanced to provide emergency planners with a tool to enter local information and develop incident scenarios to better prepare for chemical emergencies. The U.S. Census Bureau and the U.S. Coast Guard have worked with EPA and NOAA to continue to enhance the system.
