= Museo del Corallo =

Museum of coral jewellery in Naples, Italy

Coordinates: 40.838370°N 14.249433°E

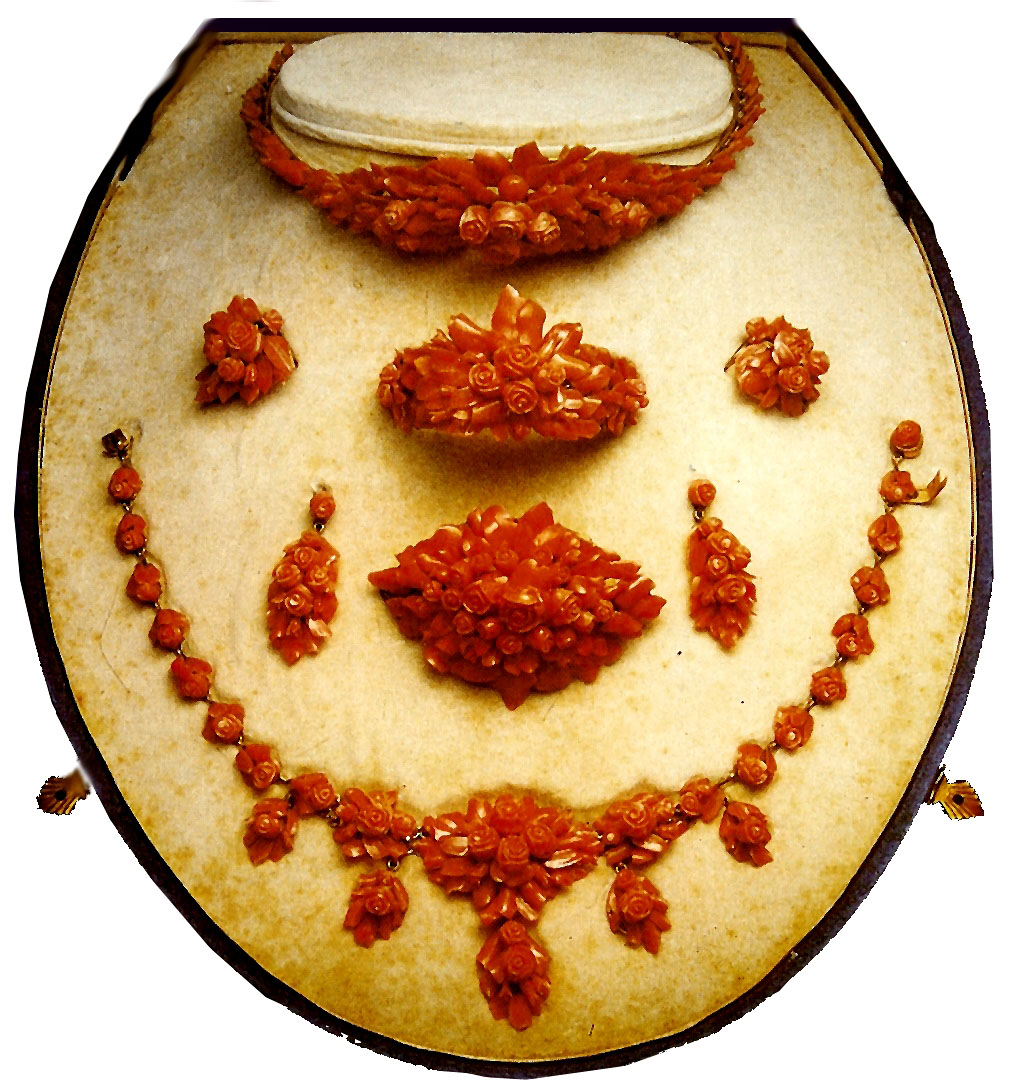
Parure made for Farida of Egypt in 1934

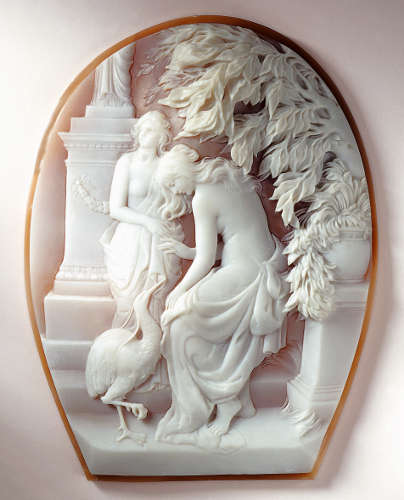
Cameo, Ascione, 1925

The Museo del Corallo is a small private museum of coral jewellery in Naples, in Campania in southern Italy. It also holds some cameos and jewellery in ivory and tortoiseshell. The works date from 1805 to 1950.
