= Cameo Shooting and Education Complex =

Shooting and archery range in Colorado, US

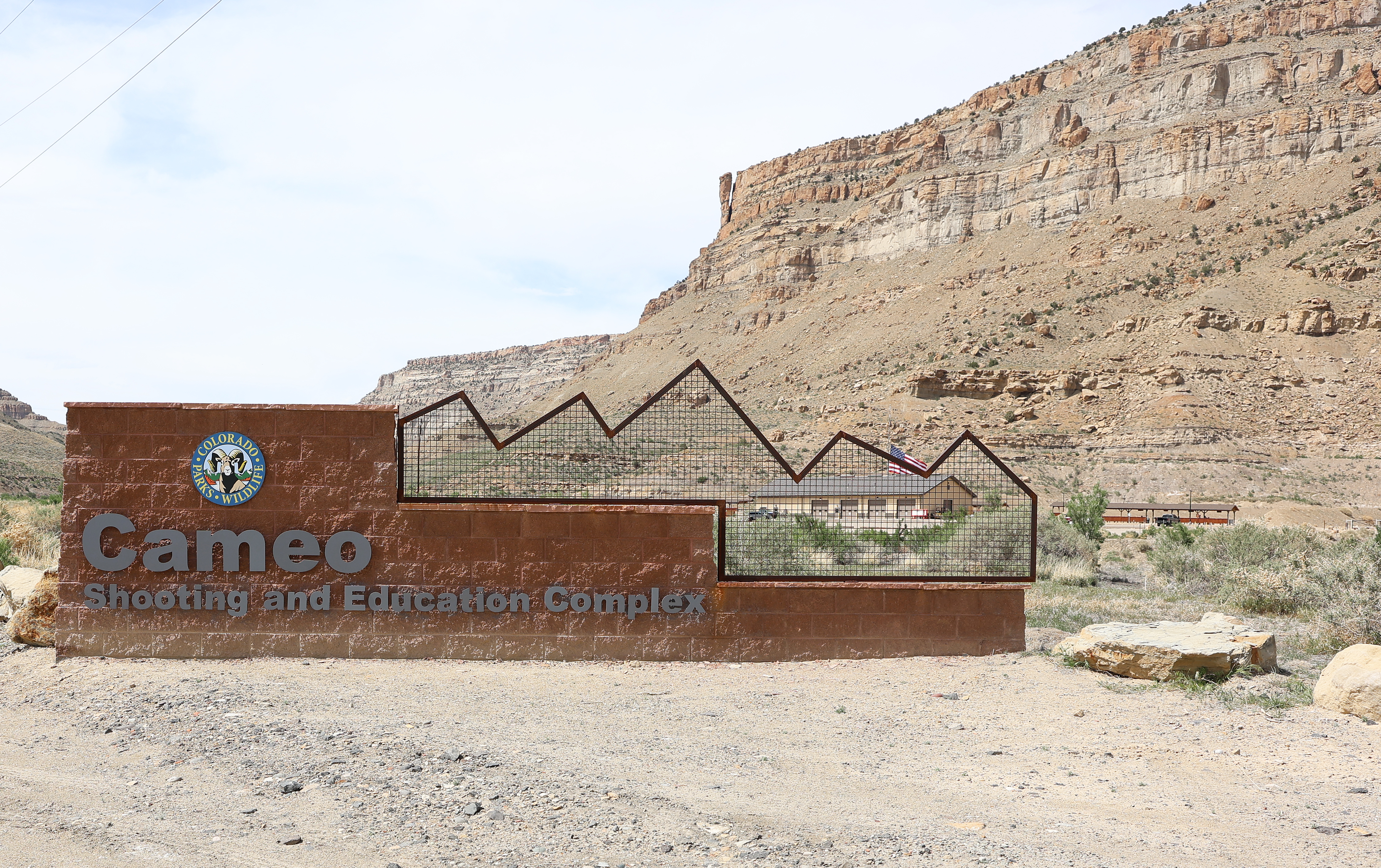
- Sign near the entrance in 2025

- Location within Colorado
- Location: Colorado, United States
- Nearest city: Grand Junction
- Coordinates: 39°9′9″N 108°19′22″W
- Elevation: 4,787 feet (1,459 meters)
- Established: 2018
- Named for: Cameo, Colorado
- Governing body: Colorado Parks and Wildlife
- Website: cpw.state.co.us/shooting-ranges/cameo-shooting-and-education-complex

The Cameo Shooting and Education Complex is a public shooting and archery range near Palisade, Colorado, owned and managed by Colorado Parks and Wildlife (CPW). The complex is listed as one of Colorado's 43 state parks in CPW's 2023 publication Your guide to Colorado's state parks. The complex hosts shooting and archery competitions.

== Facilities ==
The facilities include multiple 50-to-200-yard (46-to-183-meter) ranges for firearms and bows and arrows, shooting bays, an action shooting pavilion, 10-to-65-yard (9.1-to-59.4-meter) archery bays, picnic grounds, long-range precision steel targets that go out to 2,000 yards (1,800 meters), and two sporting clay courses.

== History ==
The complex was first opened in August 2018 with support from the State of Colorado, the town of Palisade, and others. The land the complex occupies formerly housed a coal mine and a coal-fired power plant, both of which were decommissioned early in the 21st century.

The complex takes its name from the extinct town of Cameo, Colorado which was located at the site.
