= Great Cameo of France =

Ancient Roman cameo

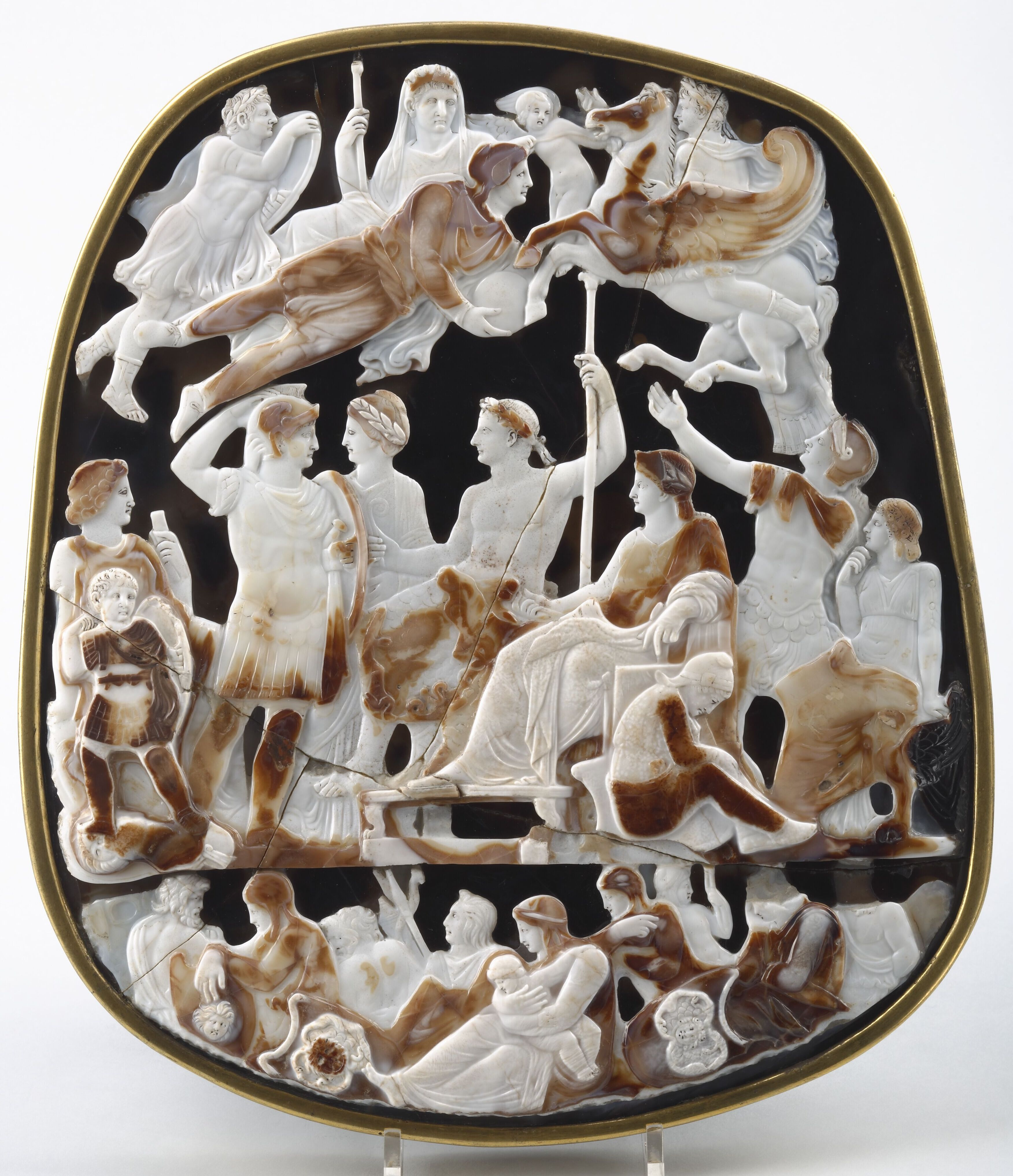
The Great Cameo of France

The Great Cameo of France (French: Grand Camée de France) is a five-layered sardonyx Imperial Roman cameo of either about 23 AD, or 50–54 AD. It is 31 cm by 26.5 cm. It is now in the Bibliothèque Nationale in Paris.

It is the largest Roman imperial cameo to have survived. It would have been an object of great value and prestige, almost certainly made for a member of the ruling Julio-Claudian dynasty. It is carved with twenty-four figures, divided into three levels. The identity of some figures, and the meaning and iconographic intent of the work have been much debated, but it is clear that the piece is intended to assert the continuity and dynastic legitimacy of the Julio-Claudian dynasty.

== Iconography ==
The interpretation of the family group alters with the date given to the gem. In the upper level are its deceased or deified members including Divus Augustus. The surrounding figures may be Drusus the Younger (son of Tiberius), and Drusus the Elder (brother of Tiberius) flying on Pegasus.

In the middle level appear the emperor Tiberius flanked by his mother Livia; standing in front of them are Germanicus, Tiberius's designated heir, together with his wife Agrippina the Elder, behind them the future emperor Caligula and the figure of Providentia (Foresight); behind Livia and Tiberius are Claudius, emperor if the cameo was made in c. 50–54 AD, and his wife Agrippina the Younger. It is possible that Agrippina the Younger's hairstyle implies a date for the cameo between her marriage to Claudius in 49 AD and the accession of her son Nero as Rome's fifth emperor in 54 AD. There are multiple figures whose identity remain unclear.

Alternatively, the cameo was commissioned to celebrate Tiberius's adoption of his grandchildren, the sons of Germanicus, as heirs in 23 AD, and the dynastic stability it ensured, comparable to the earlier adoption of Germanicus by Tiberius in 4 AD, also referenced on the cameo and in the Gemma Augustea. In the lowest level are captive barbarians.

== History ==
It appears to have come to France from the treasury of the Byzantine Empire, and is first attested in the first inventory of the treasure of the Sainte Chapelle before 1279. It was then known as the Triumph of Joseph at the Court of the Pharaoh. It was sold by Baldwin II, emperor of the Latin Empire, to Louis IX of France. It is then mentioned in the 1279 inventory list of Sainte-Chapelle in Paris. Philip VI of France consecutively sent it to Pope Clement VI in Avignon in 1342 or 1343 possibly as collateral for financial support. In 1363, Antipope Clement VII then returned it to the Dauphin, the later Charles V of France. The cameo was then brought to Saint-Chapelle in 1379.

The antiquary Nicolas-Claude Fabri de Peiresc, who saw the gem in 1620, was the first modern to realize the gem showed a Julio-Claudian group.

Louis XVI then claimed the cameo in 1792 and brought it to the Cabinet des médailles in order to protect it from the French revolutionaries. It was briefly stolen in 1804 but recovered in Amsterdam in 1805 without its original gold frame, which was replaced by a bronze one that in turn was lost until 1912.

== Bibliography ==
- Babelon, Ernest. Catalogue des Camées antiques et modernes de la Bibliothèque Nationale. Paris: E. Leroux, 1897, n° 264.
- Bibliothèque nationale de France. Trésors de la Bibliothèque nationale de France, I : Mémoires et merveilles. Paris: BNF, 1996, n° 25.
- Giard, Jean-Baptiste. Le grand camée de France, Paris, 1998
- Giuliani, Luca and Gerhard Schmidt, Ein Geschenk für den Kaiser. Das Geheimnis des großen Kameo, Verlag C.H.Beck, Munich 2010. Also: Professor Luca Giuliani, The Great Cameo of France and the succession of Tiberius (2004-2007).
- Heinlein, Christine Elisabeth (2011). Kaiser und Kosmokrator. Der Große Kameo von Frankreich als astrale Allegorie [Emperor and Cosmocrator. The Great Cameo of France as an Astral Allegory]. Dissertation, University of Tübingen.
- Jucker, HNA "Der Grosse Pariser Kameo", Jahrbuch des Deutschen Archaologischen Instituts 91 (1976) 211–250.
- Gerhard Schmidt, Klaus Scherberich, Marcell Perse (2019). Politik in Edelstein - Gemmennachschnitte von Gerhard Schmidt. Oppenheim: Nünnerich-Asmus, ISBN 978-3-96176-096-1, pp. 62–69.

== Exhibitions ==
- Exp. 1789, Le Patrimoine libéré : 200 trésors entrés à la Bibliothèque nationale de 1789 à 1799. Paris, Bibliothèque nationale, 1989, n° 83.
