= Cameo (carving) =

Method of carving

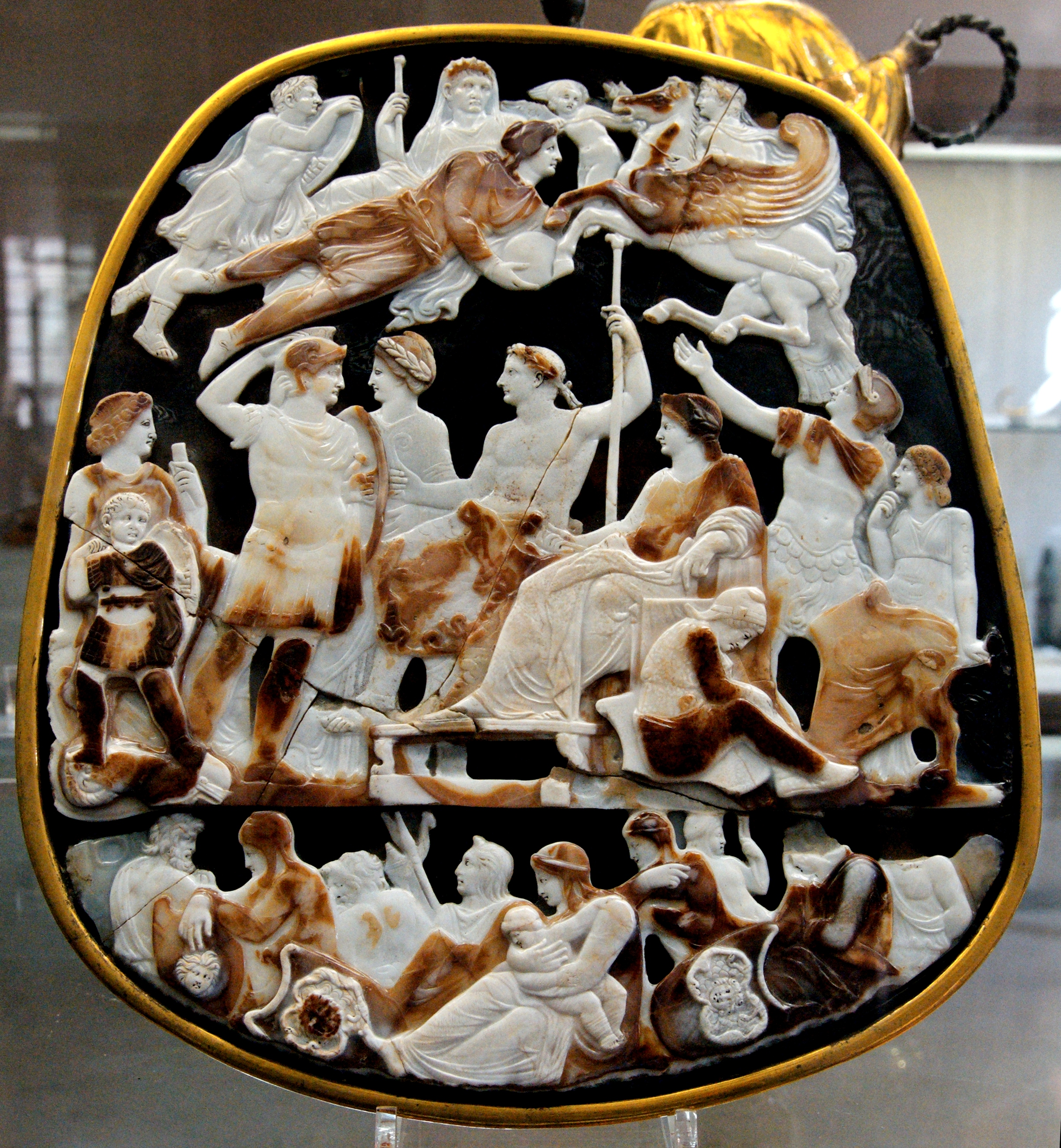
The Great Cameo of France, five layers sardonyx, Rome, c. 23 AD, the largest of Antiquity

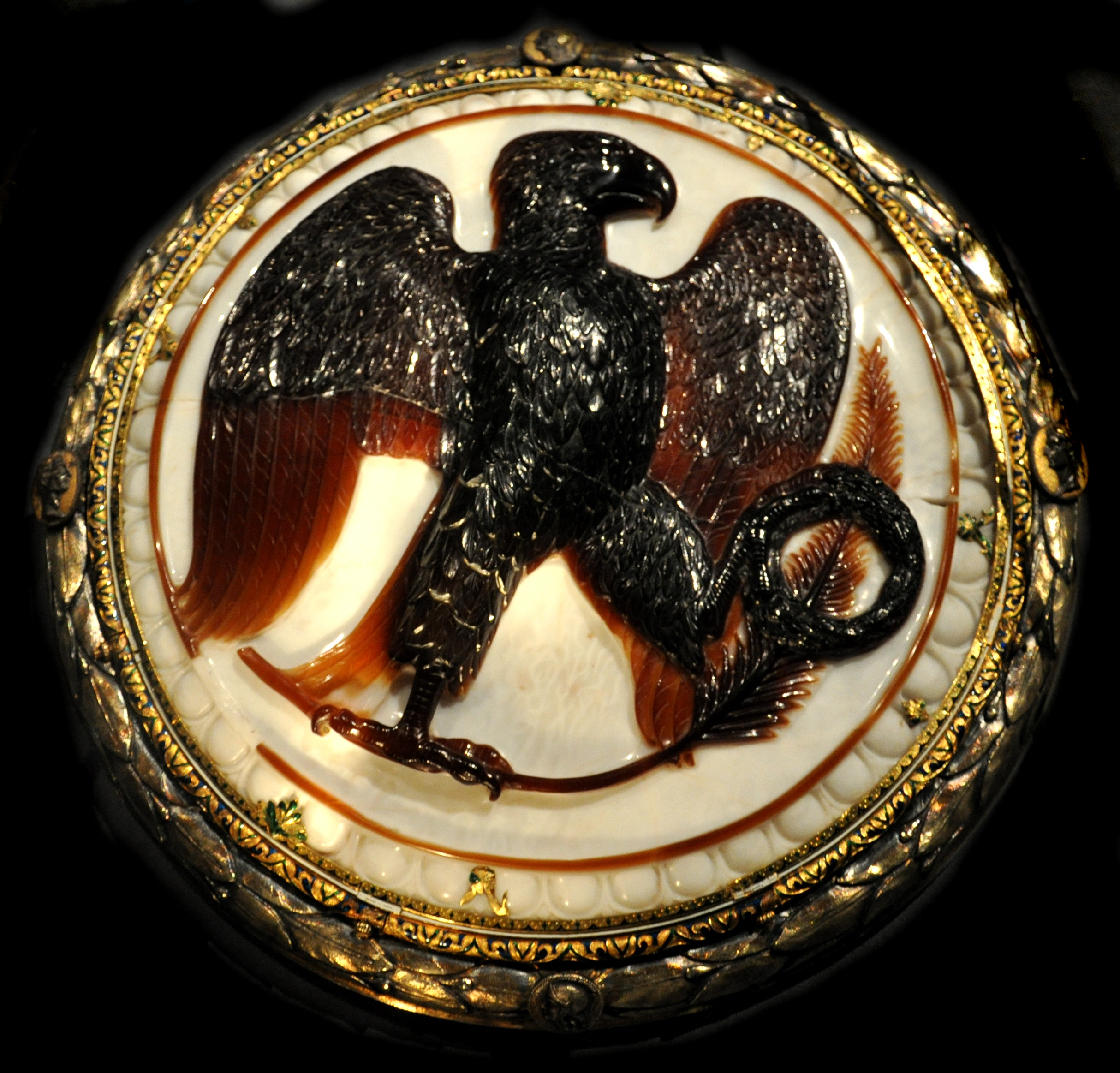
Eagle Cameo, Roman 27 B.C. Two-layered onyx.

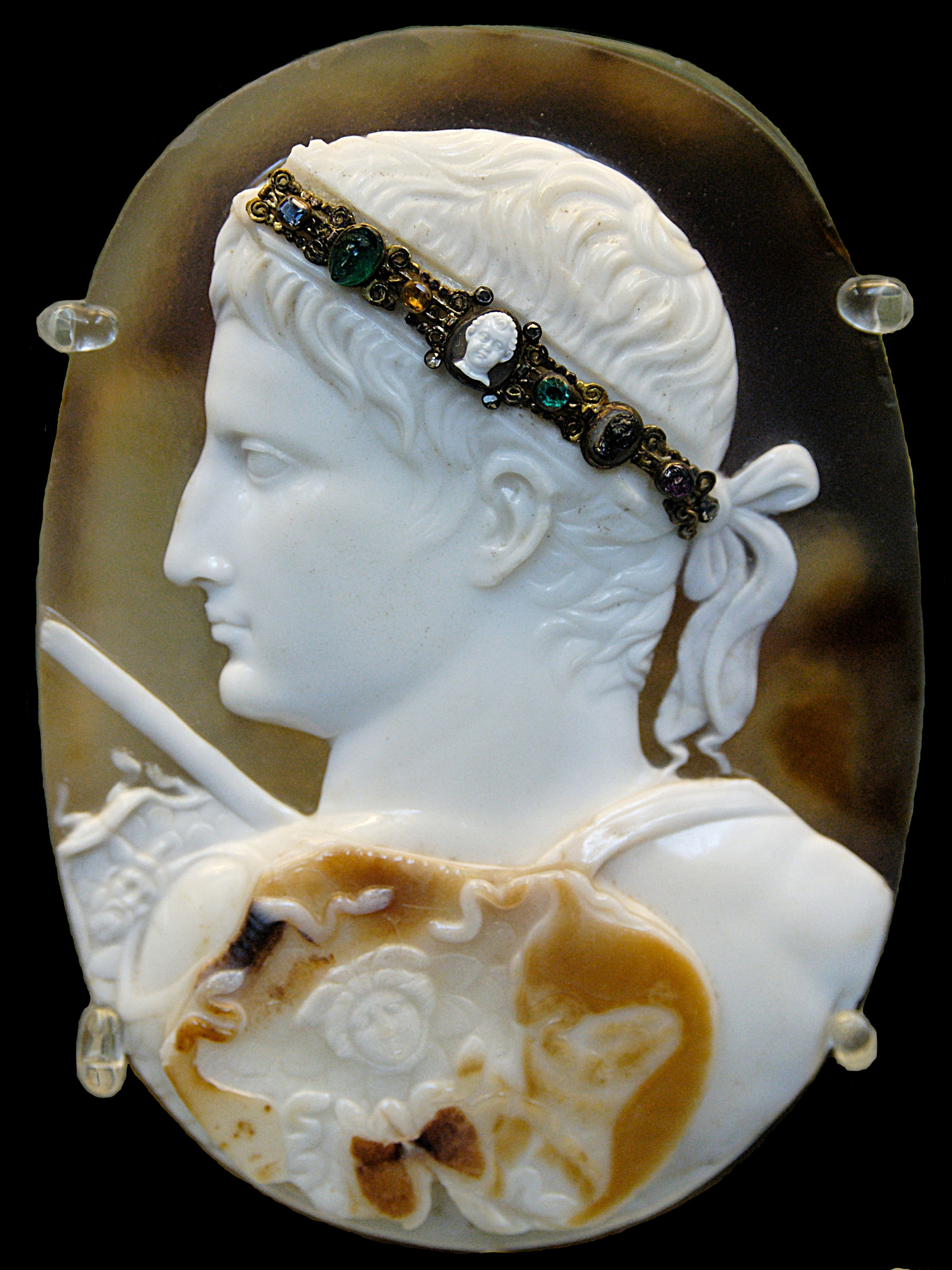
Cameo of Roman Emperor Augustus wearing a gorgoneion and a sword-belt. Three-layered sardonyx cameo, Roman artwork, c. 14–20 AD.

Cameo (/ˈkæmioʊ/) is a method of carving an object such as an engraved gem, item of jewellery or vessel. It nearly always features a raised (positive) relief image; contrast with intaglio, which has a negative image. Originally, and still in discussing historical work, cameo only referred to works where the relief image was of a contrasting colour to the background; this was achieved by carefully carving a piece of material with a flat plane where two contrasting colours met, removing all the first colour except for the image to leave a contrasting background.

A variation of a carved cameo is a cameo incrustation (or sulphide). An artist, usually an engraver, carves a small portrait, then makes a cast from the carving, from which a ceramic type cameo is produced. This is then encased in a glass object, often a paperweight. These are very difficult to make but were popular from the late 18th century through the end of the 19th century. Originating in Bohemia, the finest examples were made by the French glassworks in the early to mid-nineteenth century.

Today the term may be used very loosely for objects with no colour contrast, and other, metaphorical, terms have developed, such as cameo appearance. This derives from another generalized meaning that has developed, the cameo as an image of a head in an oval frame in any medium, such as a photograph.

== Technique ==
Ancient and Renaissance cameos were made from semi-precious gemstones, especially the various types of onyx and agate, and any other stones with a flat plane where two contrasting colours meet; these are "hardstone" cameos. In cheaper modern work, shell and glass are more common. Glass cameo vessels, such as the famous Portland Vase, were also developed by the Romans.

Modern cameos can be produced by setting a carved relief, such as a portrait, onto a background of a contrasting colour. This is called an assembled cameo. Alternatively, a cameo can be carved by the traditional, but far more difficult, method directly out of a material with integral layers or banding, such as (banded) agate or layered glass, where different layers have different colours.

Sometimes dyes are used to enhance these colours.

While traditional cameos were commonly crafted from onyx and agate, artisans have explored diverse materials over time. Rare examples include ancient cameos cut from precious stones like emeralds, lapis lazuli, and even unusual mediums such as ostrich eggshells, which produce a striking two-tone effect.

== History ==
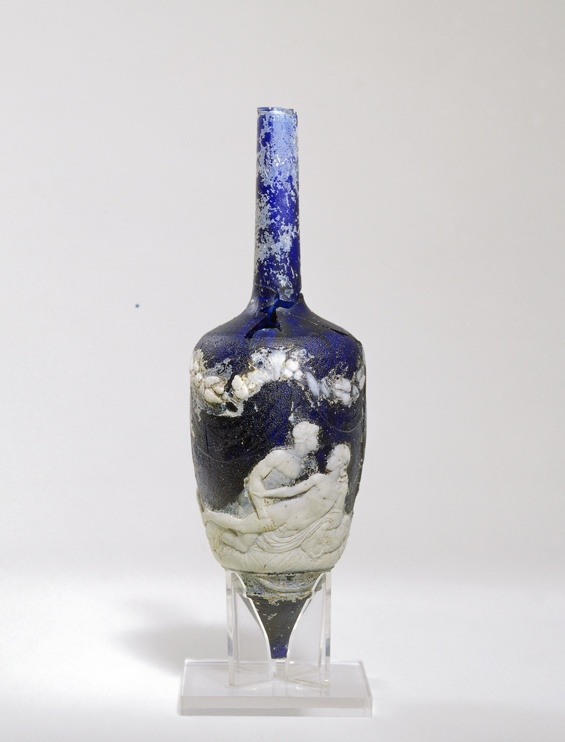
Perfume bottle made of cameo glass found in the Roman necropolis of Ostippo (Spain). On side B shown above, two males are on a bed in an erotic scene. Side A of the bottle, not shown, shows a female and a male in an erotic scene. 25 BCE – 14 CE

Sir Wallis Budge alleged that the noun cameo apparently comes from kame'o, a word used in kabbalistic slang to signify a 'magical square', i.e. a kind of talisman whereupon magical spells were carved.

Cameos are often worn as jewelry, but in ancient times were mainly used for signet rings and large earrings, although the largest examples were probably too large for this, and were just admired as objets d'art. Stone cameos of great artistry were made in Greece dating back as far as the 5th century BC. The Farnese Tazza (a cup) is the oldest major Hellenistic piece surviving. They were very popular in Ancient Rome, especially in the family circle of Augustus. The most famous stone "state cameos" from this period are the Gemma Augustea, the Gemma Claudia made for the Emperor Claudius, and the largest flat engraved gem known from antiquity, the Great Cameo of France. Roman cameos became less common around in the years leading up to 300 AD, although production continued at a much reduced rate right through the Middle Ages.

The technique has since enjoyed periodic revivals, notably in the early Renaissance, and again in the 18th and 19th centuries. Russian Empress Maria Feodorovna, the wife of Paul I, was a passionate aficionado, and a skilled cameo maker herself, the Hermitage Museum and the Gatchina Palace Museum house her enormous collection. The Neoclassical revival began in France with Napoleon's support of the glyptic arts, and even his coronation crown was decorated with cameos.

The visual art form of the cameo has even inspired at least one writer of more recent times, the 19th-century Russian poet Lev Mei, who composed a cycle of six poems entitled Камеи (Cameos, 1861), as reflections on each of the Roman rulers from Julius Caesar to Nero. In 1852 Théophile Gautier titled a collection of his highly polished, lapidary poems Emaux et Camées (Enamels and Cameos).

Historical patrons of cameo art included influential collectors like the Earl of Bessborough, who began an extensive collection in the 18th century, later acquired by the Duke of Marlborough. Edward Good's renowned collection, housed at 'Cameo Corner' in London, also contributed significantly to the appreciation of cameo craftsmanship, with notable pieces now residing in the British Museum and Sir John Soane's Museum.

During the Victorian era, there was a marked revival of shell cameos, particularly made from conch and helmet shells. These Victorian cameos were admired for their delicate softness and intricate carvings, which often depicted mythological figures, famous individuals, or symbolic themes. This era's cameos were softer and had a unique texture compared to the more rigid materials used in earlier periods, making them highly prized by collectors.

While the Victorian era popularized large shell cameos, these were often set in bright gold frames that, though eye-catching, sometimes overshadowed the intricate carvings. Wealthier patrons favored gold or silver settings, while the more affordable Pinchbeck frames enabled the middle class to partake in this popular trend.

=== Roman glass cameos ===
During the Roman period the cameo technique was used on glass blanks, in imitation of objects being produced in agate or sardonyx. Cameo glass objects were produced in two periods; between around 25 BC and 50/60 AD, and in the later Empire around the mid-third and mid-fourth century. Roman glass cameos are rare objects, with only around two hundred fragments and sixteen complete pieces known, only one of which dates from the later period. During the early period they usually consisted of a blue glass base with a white overlying layer, but those made during the later period usually have a colourless background covered with a translucent coloured layer. Blanks could be produced by fusing two separately cast sheets of glass, or by dipping the base glass into a crucible of molten overlay glass during blowing. The most famous example of a cameo from the early period is the Portland Vase.

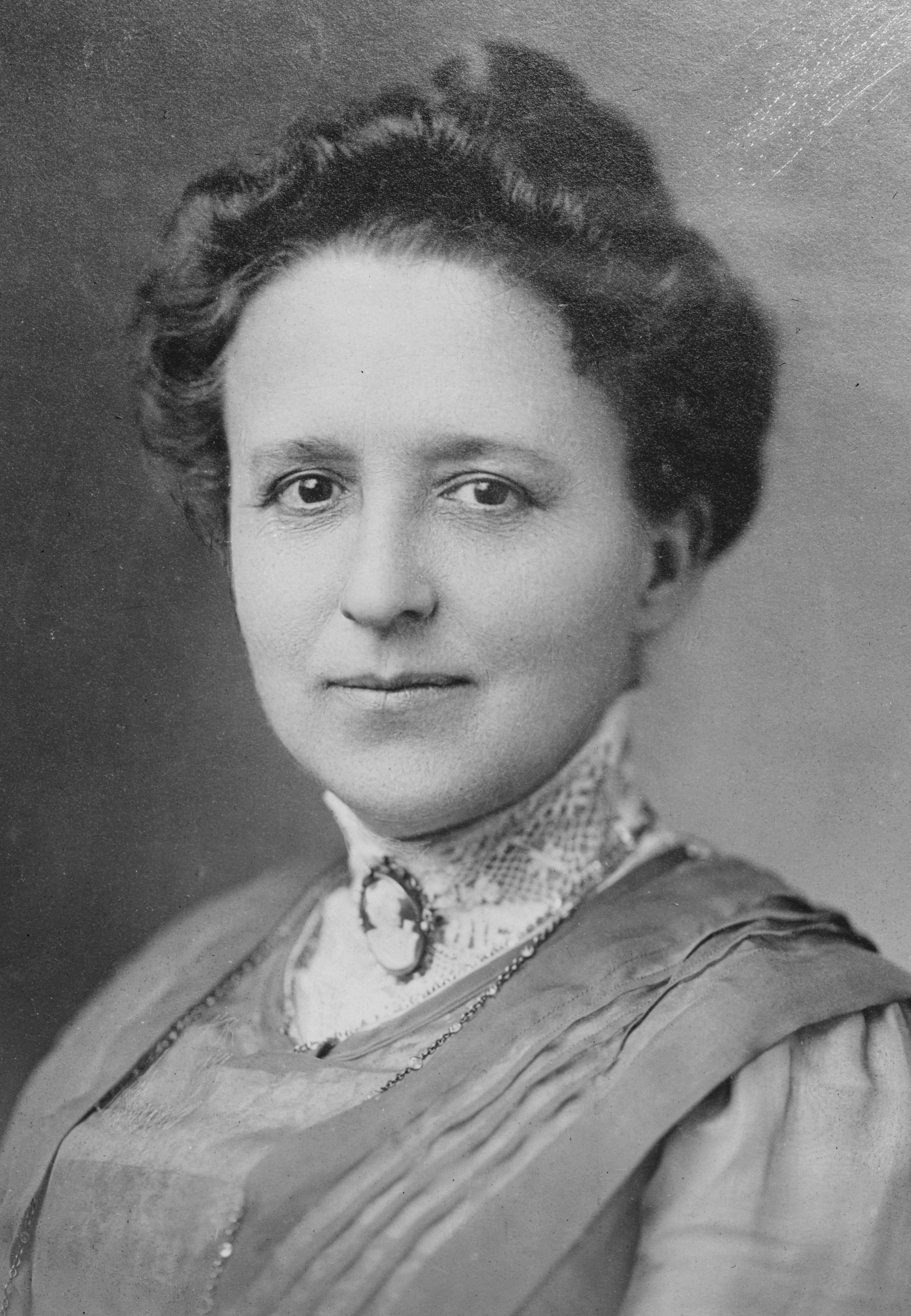
Woman wearing a cameo at her throat, on a high lace collar in the Edwardian style

=== Shell cameos ===
Although occasionally used in Roman cameos, the earliest prevalent use of shell for cameo carving was during the Renaissance, in the 15th and 16th centuries. Before that time, cameos were carved from hardstone. The Renaissance cameos are typically white on a grayish background and were carved from the shell of a mussel or cowry, the latter a tropical mollusk.

In the mid 18th century, explorations revealed new shell varieties. Helmet shells (Cassis tuberosa) from the West Indies, and queen conch shells (Eustrombus gigas) from the Bahamas and West Indies, arrived in Europe. This sparked a big increase in the number of cameos that were carved from shells. Conch shells carve very well, but their color fades over time.

After 1850 demand for cameos grew, as they became popular souvenirs of the Grand Tour among the middle class.

=== Cameo subjects ===
Classically the designs carved onto cameo stones were either scenes of Greek or Roman mythology or portraits of rulers or important dignitaries. In history, agate portrait cameos were often gifts from royalty to their subjects. These antique cameos, some more than 2000 years old, are either displayed in museums or are in private collections.

=== Notable historic cameos ===
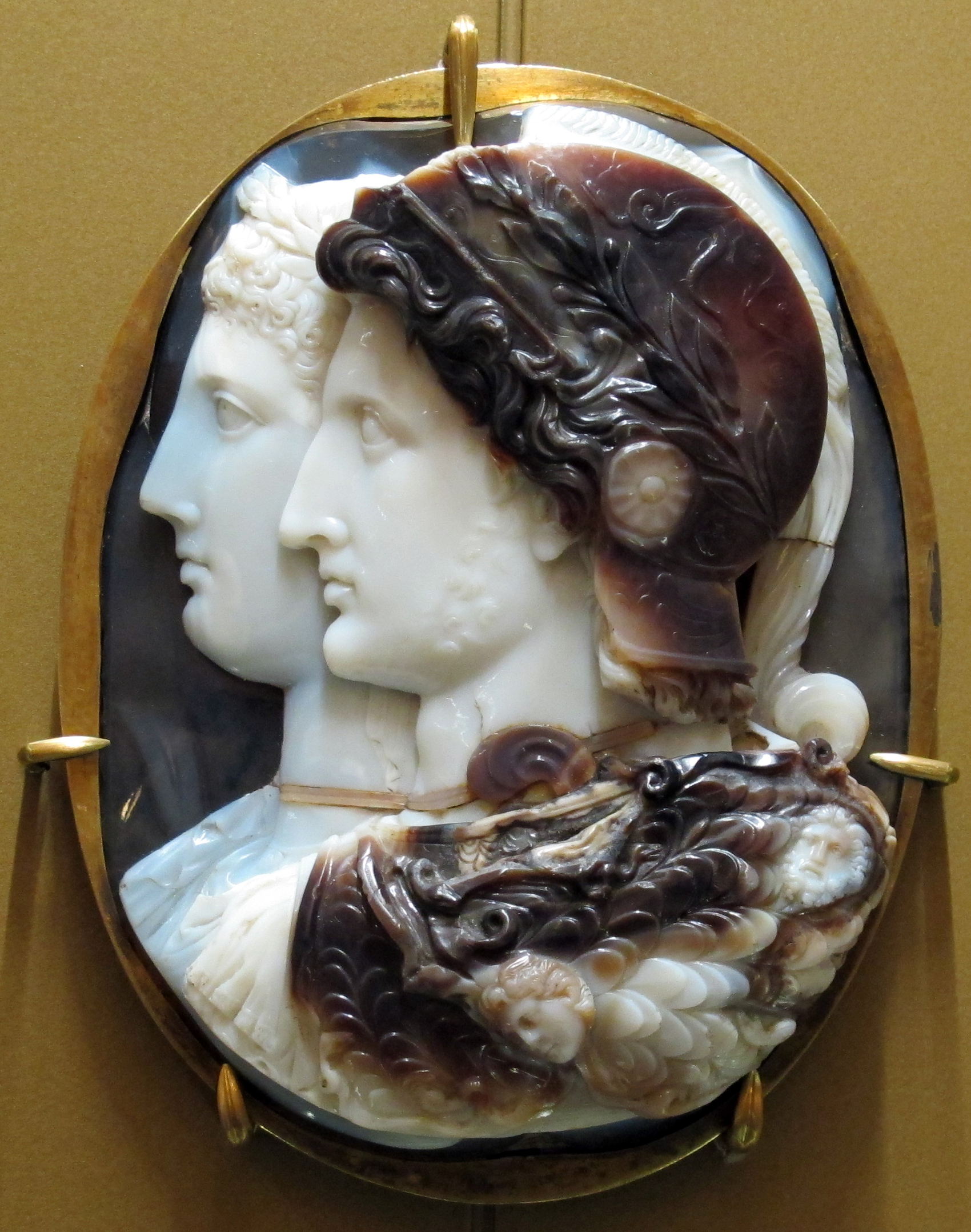
The Gonzaga Cameo in the Hermitage Museum, St. Petersburg. The gem measures 15,7 x 11,8 cm.

- Gemma Augustea Cameo – Roman, after 10 AD. Two-layered onyx.
- "Tazza Farnese". An ancient Hellenistic bowl made of a very large cameo and purchased by Lorenzo de' Medici during the Italian Renaissance.
- Cup of the Ptolemies, a large Roman or Hellenistic vessel.
- Portland Vase, the best known piece of cameo glass.
- Great Cameo of France – Roman, c. 23 AD. Sardonyx.
- Gemma Claudia Cameo – Roman, 49 AD. Five-layered onyx.
- Herophiloska Cameo – Roman, 14 to 37 AD. This portrait of a man with laurel wreath is probably of Emperor Tiberius. The work is signed Herophilos Dioskourid[ou] ('Herophilus, son of Dioscorides'). The colour of the glass was intended by the artist to imitate turquoise.
- "Gonzaga Cameo": Ptolemy II and Arsinoë II. Sardonyx. 3rd century BC.
- Agrippina the Elder Cameo. Carved in Italy in the period of 37–41 AD. The carving is a three layer agate.
- Ptolemaic double cameo — Hellenistic, 278–270/269 BC. Eleven-layered onyx.
- Blacas Cameo: Roman, about 20–50 AD. This head of Augustus was carved from a four-layered sardonyx. It is a fragment of a larger portrait of the Roman emperor-Augustus.
- "The head of Flora Cameo" – Benedetto Pistrucci. 1812 AD. In this cameo the top red-brown layer has been carved into roses. The face is carved from the white layer. The collector Richard Payne Knight purchased the Flora cameo from an Italian dealer, believing it to be Roman. The Italian carver Pistrucci claimed to have carved it himself. Payne challenged Pistrucci to carve a copy to prove his claim. The ensuing publicity earned Pistrucci several commissions.
- Schaffhausen onyx – Roman, Augustan-era, depicting Pax Augusta or Felicitas

== Modern cameos ==
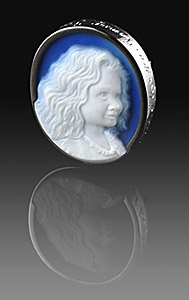
A modern hand-carved portrait cameo of white on blue-layered agate, set in 18 kt white gold

Many modern cameos are carved into layered agates. The layers are dyed to create strong color contrasts. The most usual colors used for two-layer stones are white on black, white on blue, and white on red-brown. Three-layer stones are sometimes made. The colors are usually black on white on black. The layers are translucent; this allows the artist to create shading effects by removing material to allow the background layer to show through. This way a very realistic, lifelike quality to a figure can be achieved. For example, thinning the top black layer on a three-layer stone changes its color to shades of brown. Removing material from the white layer creates shades of blue or grey, depending on the color of the base.

=== Ultrasonic machine carved cameos ===
The majority of modern agate cameos are carved with the aid of the ultrasonic mill. This is a process where multiple copies of a master design can be produced very quickly by pressing a master die onto the agate cameo blank. A film of diamond slurry is used to aid cutting and the die vibrates ultrasonically in a vertical motion. The master is often hand carved by a skilled cameo artist. The result is a cameo that has a satin surface texture described as "freshly fallen snow" (FFS) by Anna Miller. This texture and the lack of any undercutting are used by appraisers as markers to prove that the cameo is machine-made.

=== Hand-worked portrait cameos ===
These cameos are carved by hand, usually working from photographs of the subject. The fact that there is usually only one copy made means that the tooling costs involved rule out the ultrasonic carving process.

There are very few people working in this field, as this is one of the hardest challenges for any gemstone carver. The combination of a highly developed artistic ability, craft skill and many years of experience are needed to be able to create lifelike portraits.

It is quite rare, these days, for subjects other than portraits to be carved by hand as agate cameos. The traditional themes of classical scenes from mythology or a standard image of a young lady, are more likely to be made with the help of the ultrasonic carving machine as a limited collection of typically 50–200 pieces.

=== Shell cameos ===
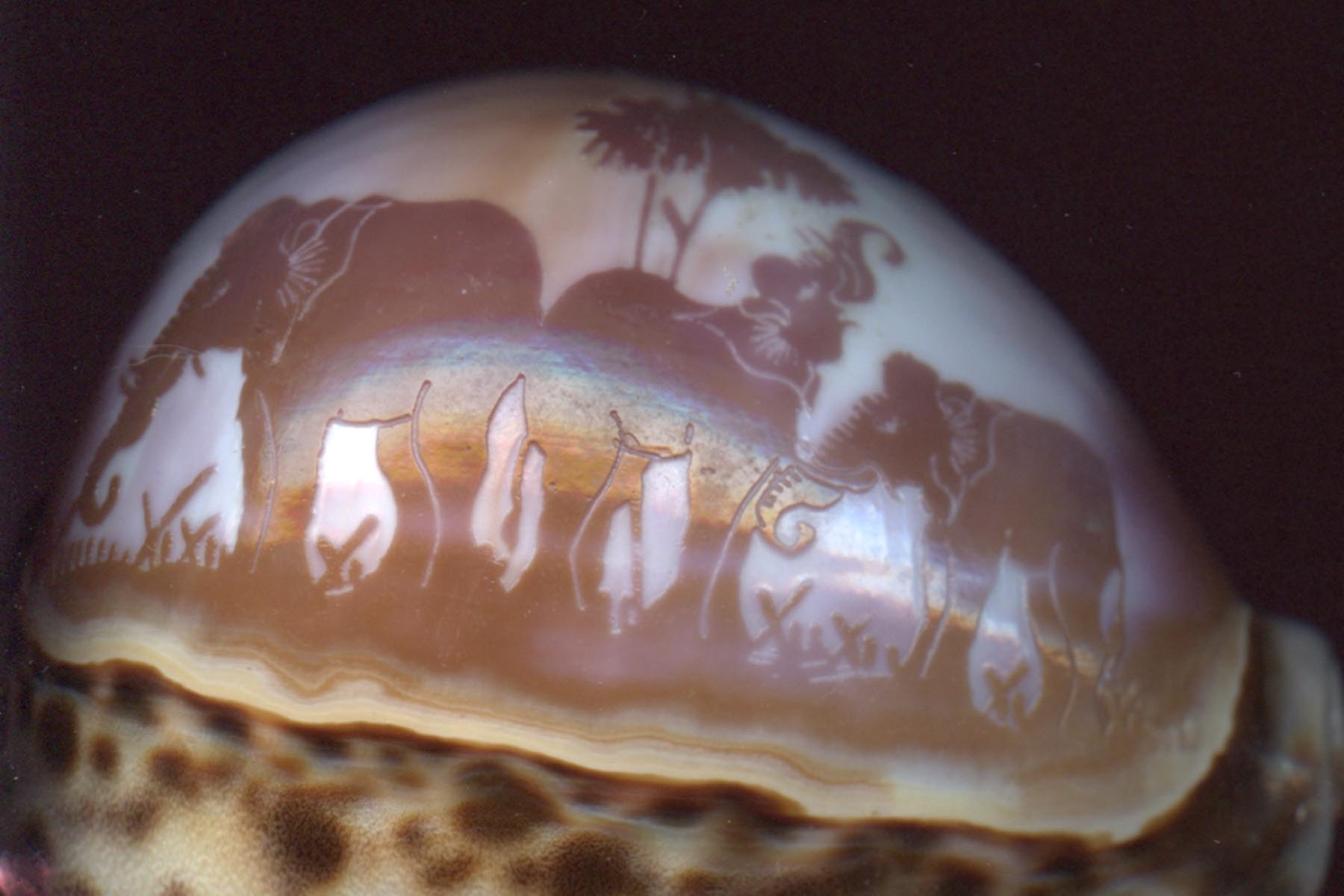
A cameo carved into the dorsum of a shell of the tiger cowry, Cypraea tigris

Since the late 19th century, the species most used in good-quality cameos has been Cypraecassis rufa, the bullmouth helmet, the shell of which can be up to 6 inches long. In this species, the upper shell layer is whitish, and the lower shell layer is a rich orange-brown. Modern sources for this shell are Madagascar and South Africa. The finest hand-carving of these shells takes place in Italy.

The most highly prized shell for carving is the emperor or queen's helmet shell, Cassis madagascariensis. This shell has white and dark brown layers and is known as sardonyx shell, and looks similar to the layered agate known as sardonyx. This shell is found in the waters of the Caribbean.

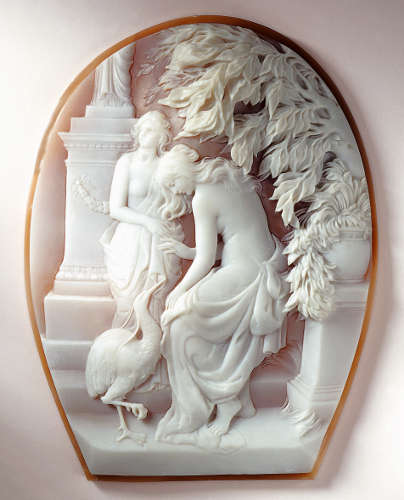
Cameo carved on Cassis madagascariensis by Ascione manufacture, 1925, Naples, Coral and Cameo Jewellery Museum Ascione

The world center for cameo carving in shell is Torre del Greco, Italy. The shells are first marked with a series of ovals in a process called signing, then cut into oval blanks for the cameo carver. The actual cameo is mainly cut with a metal scraping tool called a bulino, an invention of Jewish artisan Antonio Cimeniello. A number of metal gravers are used: flat-faced, round and three-cornered. To speed production, grinding wheels are used to quickly remove excess material. When the details are completed, the shell is then soaked in olive oil, cleaned with soap and water and selectively polished with a hand brush.

== Notable carvers ==
- Giovanni Noto (1902–1985)-Torre del Greco, Italy
- Tommaso Saulini (1793–1864)-Rome, Italy
- Luigi Saulini (1819–1883)-Rome, Italy, (son of Tommaso)

== See also ==
- Cross of Lothair contains in its center the three-layered cameo of the Roman Emperor Augustus.
- Jasperware - popular ceramic imitation of cameos

== Bibliography ==
- Jarrett, Diana (2009). Cameos Old and New- 4th Edition. GemStone Press. ISBN 978-0-943763-60-6.
- Miller, Anne (2003). Cameos Old and New. Springer. ISBN 0-442-00278-5.
- Draper, James (2009). Cameo Appearances: Metropolitan Museum of Modern Art. Metropolitan Museum of Art. ISBN 978-0-300-14145-0.
- Dunlop, Paul H., The Jokelson Collection of Cameo Incrustation, ISBN 0-9619547-3-6
- Scarisbrick, Dianna (2003). Classical Gems: Ancient and Modern Intaglios and Cameos in the Fitzwilliam Museum, Cambridge. Cambridge University Press. ISBN 978-0-521-23901-1.
- Henig, Martin (1990). The Content Family Collection of Ancient Cameos-Ashmolean Museum. Ashmolean Museum, Oxford. ISBN 978-1-85444-004-4.
- Fiorelli, Anna (1989). Corals and Cameos – The treasures of Torre Del Greco.
- Walters, H.B (1927). Catalogue of the Engraved Gems and Cameos, Greek, Etruscan, and Roman in the British Museum.
- Neverov, O (1971). Antique Cameos in the Hermitage Collection. Aurora Art Publishers.
