= Gemma Augustea =

Gem sculpture in ancient Rome

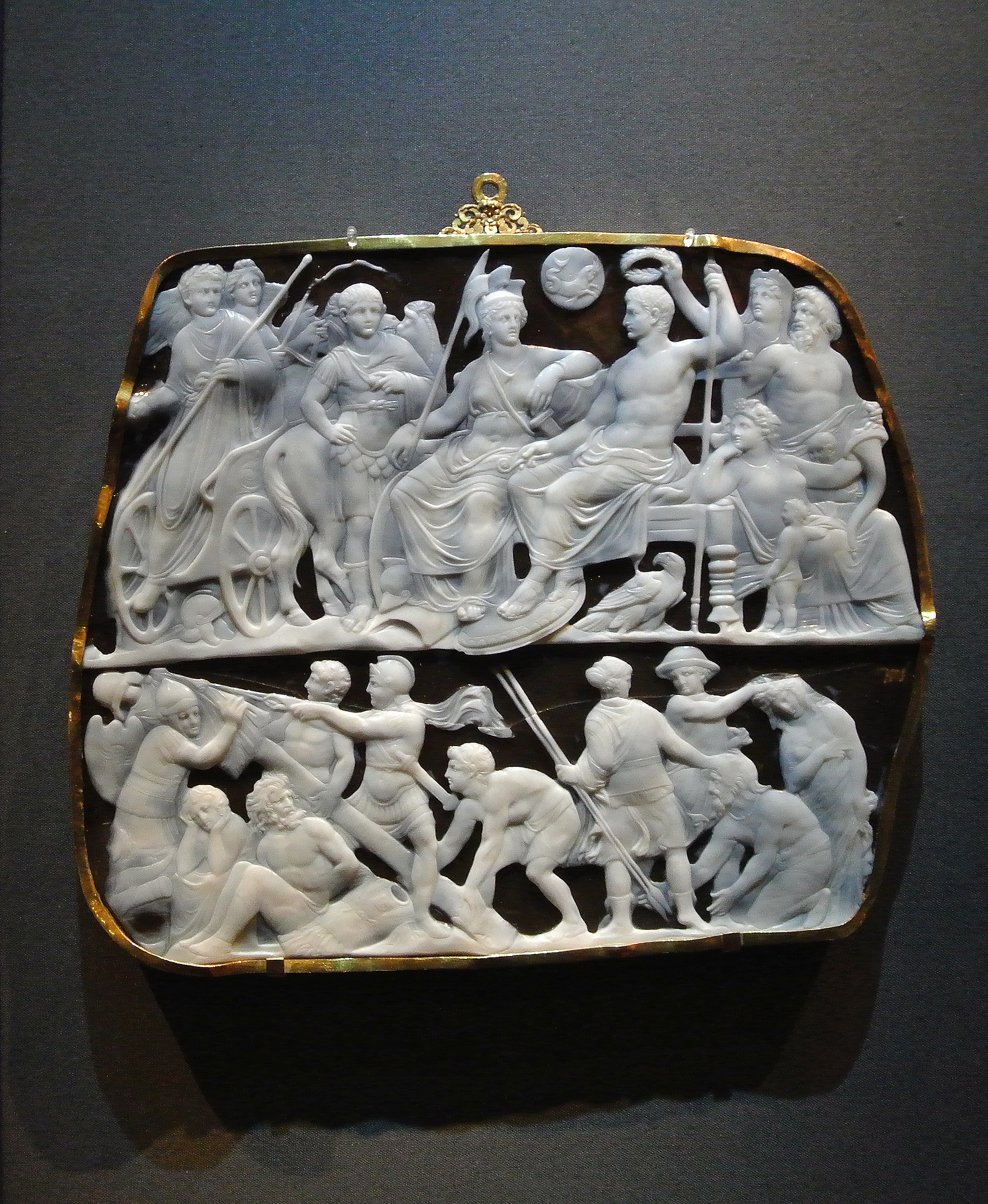
The Gemma Augustea in the Kunsthistorisches Museum, Vienna.

The Gemma Augustea (Latin, Gem of Augustus) is an ancient Roman low-relief cameo engraved gem cut from a double-layered Arabian onyx stone. It is commonly agreed that the gem cutter who created it was either Dioscurides or one of his disciples, in the second or third decade of the 1st century AD.

== Creation and characteristics ==
The Gemma Augustea is a low-relief cameo engraved gem cut from a double-layered Arabian onyx stone. One layer is white, while the other is bluish-brown. The painstaking method by which the stone was cut allowed minute detail with sharp contrast between the images and background, also allowing for a great deal of shadow play. The size of the gem also made for easier manipulation and a grander scene. It stands 7.5 inches (190 mm) tall with a width of 9 inches (230 mm) and an average thickness of 0.5 inches (13 mm).

It is commonly agreed that the gem cutter who created Gemma Augustea was either Dioscurides or one of his disciples. Dioscurides was Caesar Augustus’ favorite gem cutter. Pliny regarded him as the finest gem engraver of antiquity. His work, and copies of it, are seen from all over the ancient Roman world. In terms of the ages of the portrait figures, the gem is "set" as though in the period c. AD 10–20, although some scholars believe it to have been created decades later because of their interpretation of the scene.

If Dioscurides, or cutters following his example, made it, the gemma was probably made in the court of Caesar Augustus. At some time in antiquity it moved to Byzantium, perhaps after Constantine I had officially moved the capital of the empire there. Augustus, though fully accepting and encouraging cult worship of the emperor outside Rome and Italy, especially in more distant provinces with traditions of deified rulers, did not allow himself to be worshipped as a god inside Rome. If this gem was made during his lifetime (he died in AD 14), it would perhaps have been made as a gift to a respected family in a Roman province or client kingdom. Alternatively, if the gem was made after Augustus’ death, the identity of one or more of the portraits may be different from the usual identification. Another viewpoint is that the gem does portray Augustus as a god in his lifetime, but was cut specifically for a close friend or relative in the inner court circle. Similar issues arise with other Imperial cameos such as the Blacas Cameo in the British Museum.

The whereabouts of the gemma were undocumented, though it remained relatively intact and was probably always above ground, until 1246 when it was recorded in the treasury of the abbey of Saint-Sernin in the French city of Toulouse. The gemma aroused from that time the lusts of the powerful: in 1306 Pope Clement V offered to exchange it for the construction of a bridge over the Garonne, the magistrates of Toulouse then had to strengthen its surveillance because there were several attempts to seize it with the complicity of the abbot, including one of Pope Paul II in 1470. In 1533 King Francis I of France, visiting the city, took the opportunity to appropriate it on the pretext of showing it to Pope Clement VII. But he took it directly to his palace at Fontainebleau, where sympathisers of the Catholic League of France stole it in 1590. Not long thereafter it was sold for 12,000 ducats to Rudolph II, Holy Roman Emperor. During the 17th century, it was set in German gold. This setting shows that the gem must have been damaged, the upper left side being broken with at least one other figure missing, probably before Rudolph II bought it, but definitely before 1700. The gem is now in the Kunsthistorisches Museum in Vienna.

== Interpretations of the figures and scenes ==
=== Upper tier ===
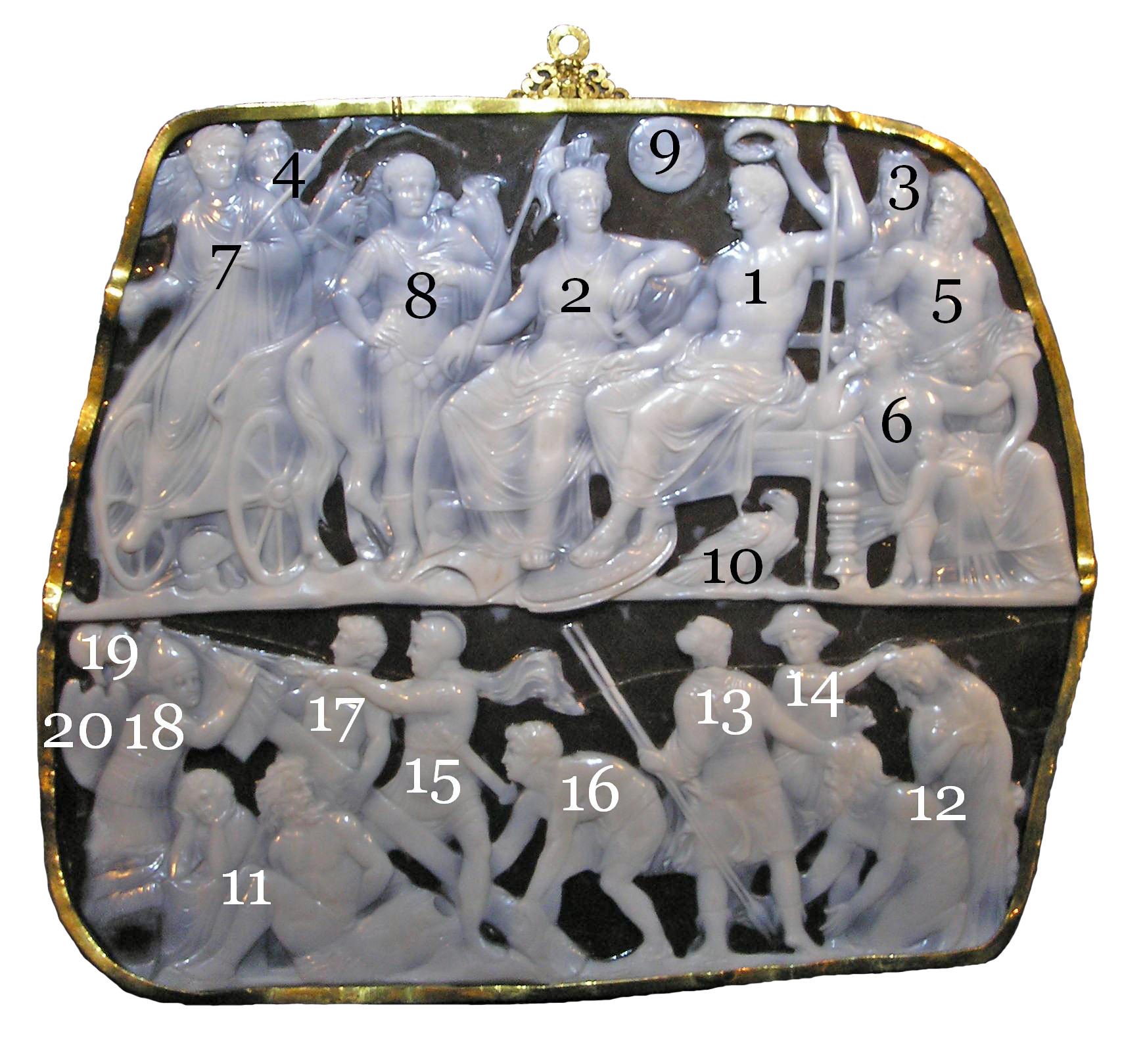
Gemma Augustea, with reference numbers.

The enthroned figure, #1 in the numbered illustration, is usually taken to be Augustus, although in some interpretations, it could represent a later Roman ruler. Figure #1 is holding the augur's staff, known as a lituus, a symbol of military high command. Figure #3 is the most readily identifiable, having characteristics held by no other. The woman is Oikoumene - the personification of the inhabited world. This inhabited or civilized world is either that of the early Roman Empire, or more likely the Mediterranean world conquered by Alexander the Great. She wears upon her head a mural crown and veil. She is crowning figure #1 with the corona civica of oak leaves - used to commend someone for saving the life of a Roman citizen. In this grand scale depiction, however, it is given to figure #1 because he saved a multitude of Roman citizens.

Figure #5 and #6 seem to be closely related. Figure #5 is Oceanus or Neptune whose significance is often seen as one balancing the scene across from #4 and #7, and also an important onlooker, as he represents the realm of water. Below him is a reclined personification of either Gaia or Italia Turrita (#6). The scholars who see Gaia link her with the cornucopia and the children surrounding her, who may represent seasons. It might be odd that Gaia holds the horn of plenty when it seems as if the horn is not presently producing anything. This supports an argument that she is not Gaia, but Italia, for historically there was famine at the scene's event. Also, she wears a bulla, a locket of some sort, around her neck, which, again, would seem odd for Gaia to wear. Either way, the children represent seasons, probably summer and Autumn, as one of them carries grains.

Figure #10 is the eagle of Jupiter. The eagle could be showing that figure #1 is seated in the role of Jupiter. Seated next to figure #1 is Roma. The helmeted goddess holds a spear in her right arm while her left hand lightly touches the hilt of her sword, probably showing that Rome was always prepared for war. Besides showing her feet resting upon the armor of the conquered, Roma seems to look admiringly towards figure #1. Though there might be a dispute as to who #1 is, it is often said that the image of Roma strongly resembles Livia, Augustus’ long-lived wife. Not only was she his wife, but from a previous marriage, the mother of Tiberius. The reason for the cutting of this gem is also called into question when it is noted that Roma was not worshiped inside Rome till around the rule of Hadrian. Thus the gem might have been custom cut for a friend in the provinces.

Figure #4 is Victoria driving the chariot that holds the descending figure #7. She is obviously the deliverer of the victorious but not necessarily there for celebration, as it seems she might be impatiently urging figure #7 on to his next campaign. In associating Victoria with the chariot, it is necessary to analyze some historical importance relating to the chariot and the horses around it. The two foreshortened horses in front of the chariot are part of the chariot team, whereas the single horse to the side cannot be, and might belong to figure #8. Historically, a victory chariot was driven by four horses forming a quadriga, not the mere two represented on the gemma, a biga. This might show that figure #7 is not a triumphator.

=== Lower tier: erection of tropaion ===
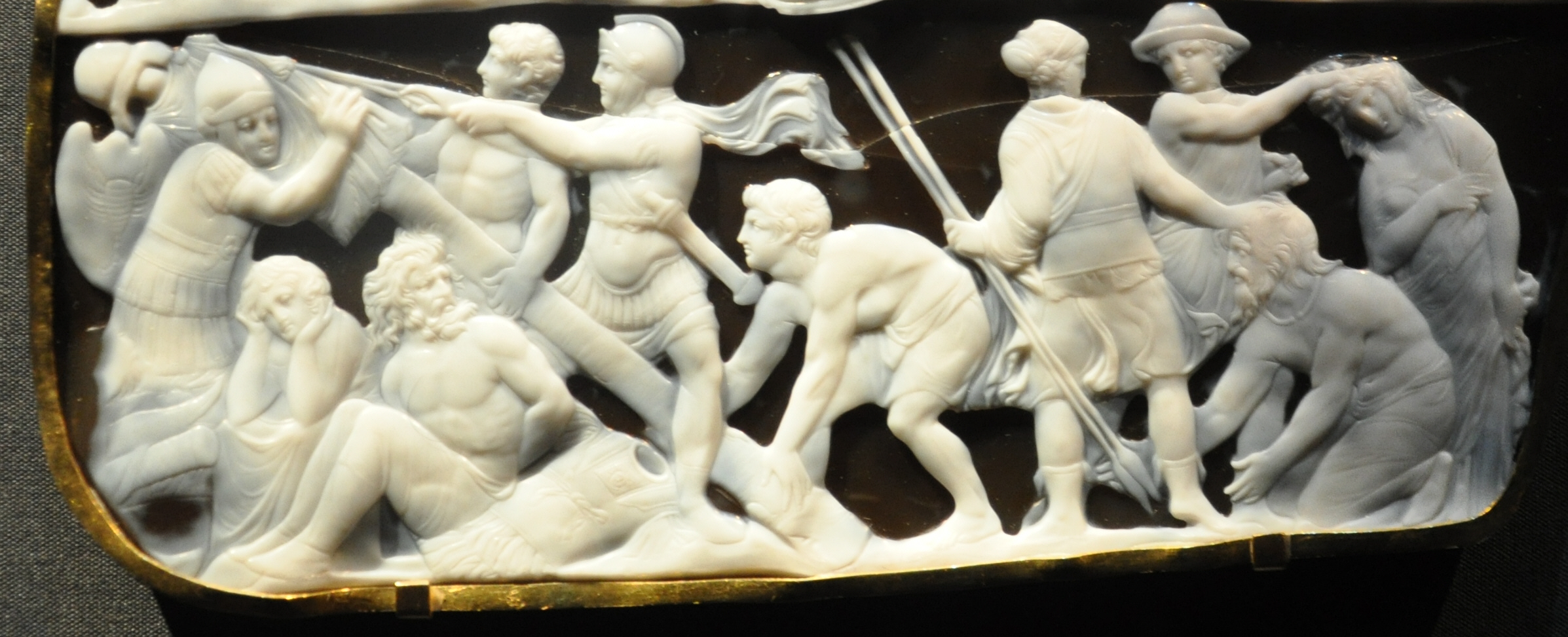
The lower register

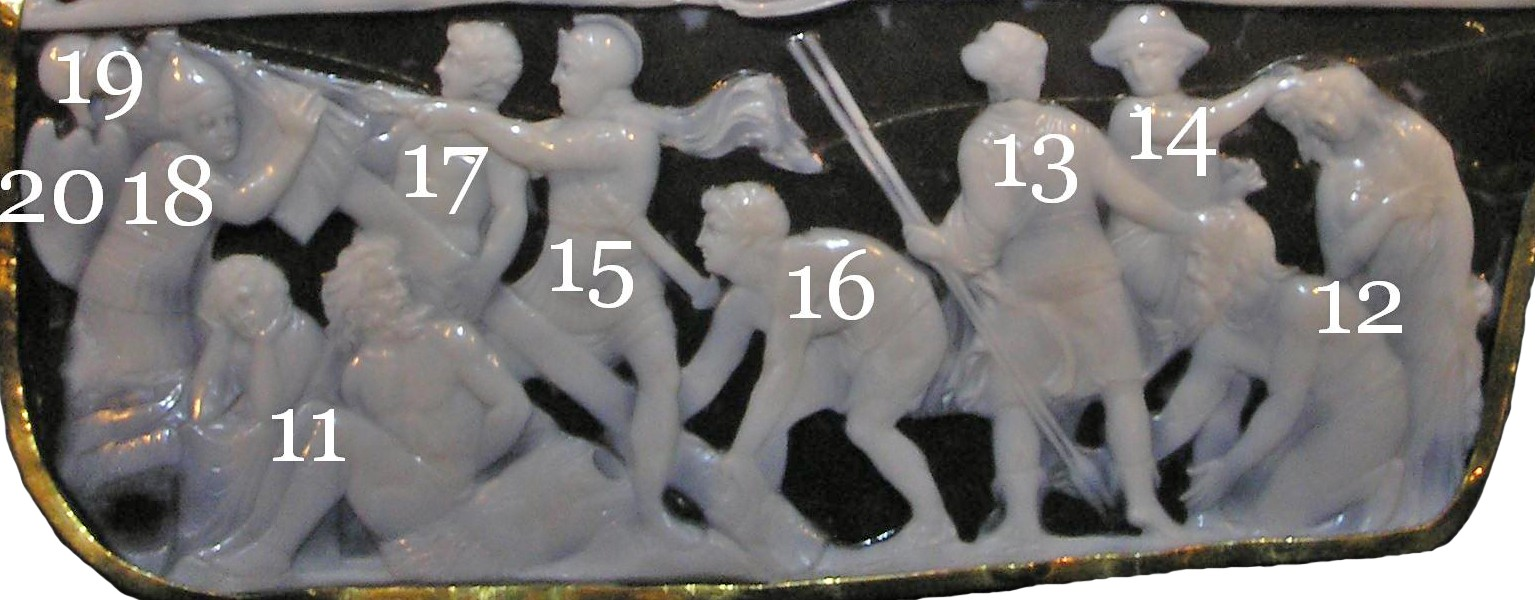
Key to lower register

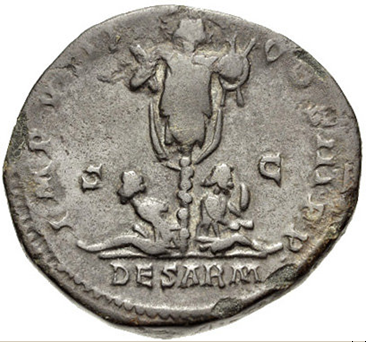
A fully erected tropaion with shackled and adorsed seated male and female Sarmatian captives (the right-hand female with head resting on hand, possibly a representation of the defeated "Sarmatia") tied to base. Dupondius from reign of Emperor Marcus Aurelius, AD 161–180.

The lower scene, in which the figures are less readily identifiable, depicts the erection of a tropaion. In some interpretations of the scene, all the lower figures are by design anonymous. Other interpretations attribute definite real or mythological persons to the figures. At left, the seated male and female figures (combined in #11) are either Celts or Germans, as is apparent from their clothing and hair styles, including the man's beard, and represent prisoners of war, symbolizing the Roman victory. The man is bound with his hands behind his back, and both are apparently about to be tied to the base of the as yet half-erected tropaion (figure #19), a trophy of war displayed upon winning a battle, usually fixed into the ground at the position of the "turning-point" of the battle in favour of the victors. The trophy consists of a wooden cross, designed to support human clothing. A helmet is placed on top, and the breastplate and weaponry of the enemy is placed upon it. In the scene, four young men are raising the trophy into a vertical position. Figure #18 is the least identifiable, but his helmet has led some to believe that he may be a Macedonian soldier of King Rhoemetalces I, who helped Tiberius in Pannonia.

Figure #15 is often identified as a personification of the god Mars with his armor and flowing cape. Although figures #16 and #17 seem less important, they look very much alike and may represent the constellation Gemini. Gemini is the more difficult constellation to pick out, and it might represent the hidden identity of figure #8. Two others, however, are more obvious. Figure #20 is a shield with a large scorpion emblazoned upon it. Tiberius was born in November, and thus might be represented with such an item. Figure #9 shows Augustus’ favorite sign, the Capricorn. Although Augustus might have been conceived during December, he claimed the Capricorn as his constellation. The sun or moon, which were necessary to show the full power of a constellation, is seen behind the sign. Mars is represented by figure (#15), and thus at least three signs of the Zodiac are evident.

Figure #13 is probably Diana, identified with the moon, although some commentators believe her to be a mere auxiliary troop with #14. Diana holds spears in her left hand and her right hand seems to rest on the head of the man in figure #12, but not gripping his hair as supposed by many. Another identifying feature of Diana is her bountiful hair, bound up for the hunt, and her hunting clothes. Figure #14 might be an auxiliary, but more likely he personifies Mercurius (Mercury/Hermes), identified by his rimmed hat. Mercurius seems to be dragging the female in figure #12 by her hair towards the tropaion. The scene is clearly complex. Many interpretations insist that the ‘auxiliaries’ are dragging the barbarian prisoners to join their kindred in being bound to the trophy. However, there are indications that this might not be the case at all. First, the man on his knees is begging for mercy from Diana, who does look down on him. That same man wears around his neck a torque, suggesting him to be a Celt or German. It may be significant that Diana has her back turned to the observer and possibly the scene itself. She is the only one as such, and perhaps to contrast the celebration of victory in battle, she shows instead mercy to one pleading for his life. In addition, since the man is a leader, it makes for better propaganda that he should beg for mercy before a Roman goddess. Mercurius might not be dragging the woman to be bound to the trophy, but might be bringing her to kneel before Diana to beg for mercy as well. She shows the sign of a truce by placing her hand upon her chest. Perhaps Diana and Mercurius are sheltering them, perhaps offering them salvation in the final moments of victory. Whatever the case, the couple in #12 are not comparable to the despairing couple in #11, with whom they appear both to balance and contrast; balance by having barbarians on the right and left, literally balancing the composition, and contrast as one couple being doomed to be bound at the trophy, and the other begging for what looks like a chance of mercy.

== Overall scene ==
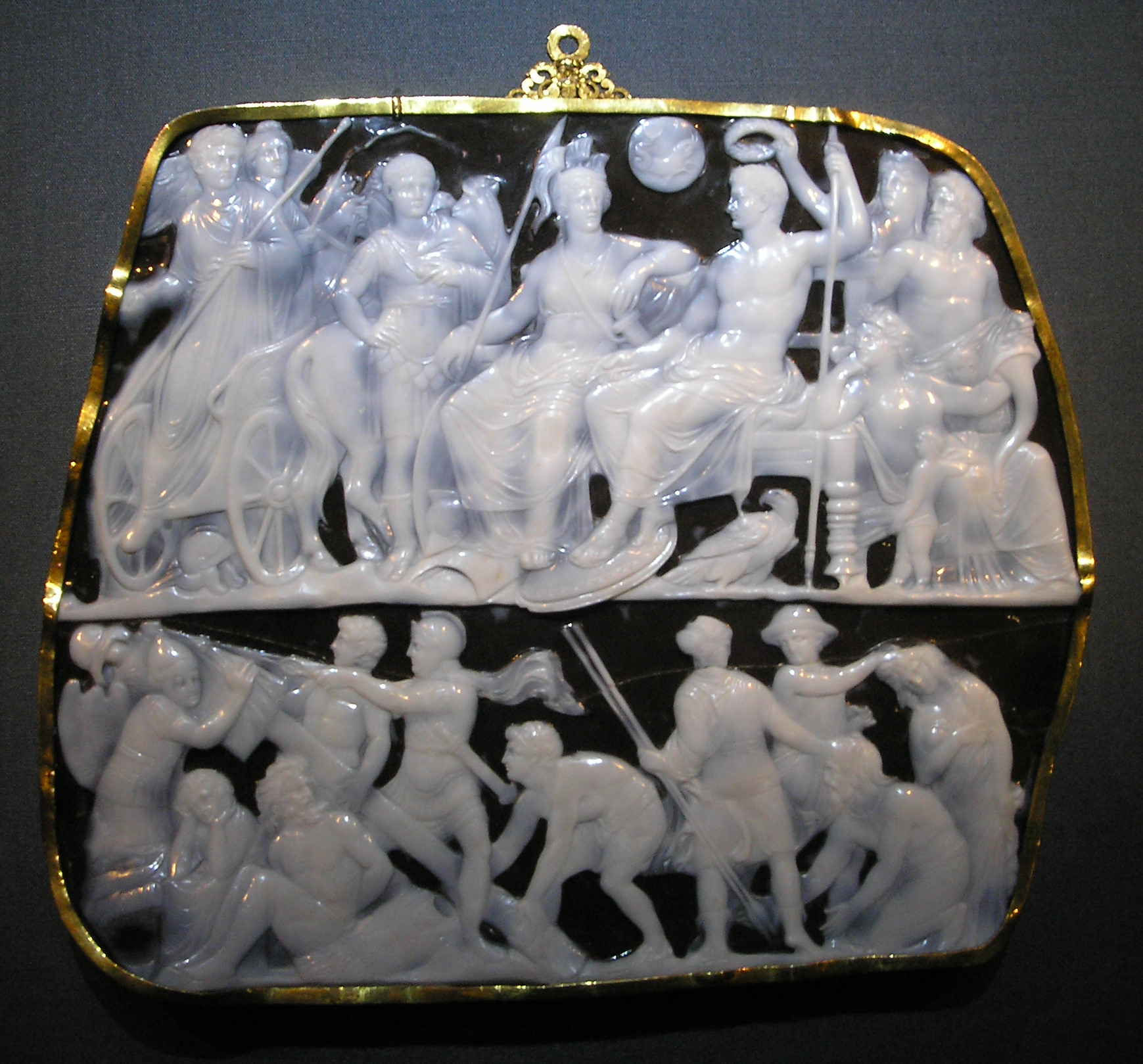
A different view.

The upper and lower scenes take place at different times, illustrating cause and effect. The lower scene takes place at the northern frontiers, just after a battle won by the Romans, who erect a victory trophy. Gathered prisoners of war are waiting for their punishment in grief or begging for mercy at the hands of assisting gods. The triumph on the battlefield precedes the triumph on the upper plate.

The upper scene is a fusion of Rome, Olympus, and the world of cities. Augustus is conspicuously above the birth sign he claimed, while the eagle personifying him as Jupiter sits below. He ended many years of internal strife for Rome and will forever wear the oak crown. In his right hand he holds a lituus – his augury stick in which he reads the signs and declares wars to be just. He faces Roma, representing all he united and saved from civil bloodshed. He sits equal to Roma, personifying a god. His feet lay upon armor, which could be identified with the newly conquered barbarians, or it may depict the descent of the Julian family from Mars through his human children Romulus and Remus. Unlike all the other figures, except for #7 and #8, the depiction of Augustus is considered to be an actual portrait because of the iris seen in his eye. Tiberius, Augustus’ adopted son, recently having fought in the north, comes back momentarily – for Victoria anxiously urges that he continue on to fight new battles and receive his triumph.

There are problems with this interpretation, however. The chariot is not one of victory. It would be unusual for a two-horse chariot to be used for the triumph. Also, Tiberius wears the toga. The toga represents civility and peace, not war. Perhaps this is a way to hand the victory to Augustus’ auguries. Tiberius steps down from the chariot, doing obeisance to Augustus, giving his adoptive parent the triumph and victory. If all this is true, then figure #8 could still be one of two persons, Drusus or Germanicus. By this age, Drusus was probably already dead, having fallen from his horse and suffered fatal injuries. It could be, then, a representation of Drusus, and his memory, since he was fondly regarded by almost all. Since he is clad in fighting garb, the helmet probably beside him under the chariot, and coincidentally standing next to a horse, this could very well be Drusus. In addition, there are three constellations relating to the three portraits. Drusus would claim Gemini, though the Gemini is quite covert. If the portrait represented Drusus as alive, however, the gem would have been made about the same time as the Ara Pacis and the Altar of Augustus, sometime before 9 B.C., the year of Drusus’ death.

Others, though, think that Figure #8 is Germanicus, son of Drusus. If the gem was commissioned no earlier than A.D. 12 and referred to Tiberius’ triumph over the Germans and the Pannonians, it would stand to reason that Germanicus, born in 13 B.C., was old enough to don gear and prepare for war, years after his father's death. Germanicus was also looked upon quite fondly by Augustus and others. The dispute carries on.

Gemma Augustea seems to be based on dramatic Hellenistic compositions. The refined style of execution was more common in the late Augustan or earlier Tiberian age, though more likely Augustan. It is said that the image of Augustus as Jupiter is linked to future Roman triumphs by Horace in his Odes:

He'll be brave who trusts himself to perfidious foes,
and he will crush the Carthaginians in a second war
who has tamely felt the chains upon his fettered
wrists and has stood in fear of death.
Such a one, not knowing how to live life secure,
has mixed peace with war.
O mighty Carthage, you rise
all the higher upon Italian ruins!
Tis said he set aside his wife’s chaste kisses and his
little children, as one bereft of civil rights,
and sternly bent his manly gaze upon the ground
till he should strengthen the Senate’s wavering purpose
by advice ne’er given before,
and amid sorrowing friends should hurry forth a glorious exile.
Full well he knew what the barbarian torturer was making
ready for him; and yet he pushed aside the kinsmen
who blocked his path and the people who would halt his going
with no less unconcern than if some case in court
had been decided, and he were leaving the tedious
business of his clients, speeding to Venafran fields,
or to Lacedaemonian Tarentum.

— Horace, Odes III 5

== Sources ==
- Clayton, Peter, Treasures of Ancient Rome, New Jersey, 1995, pp. 163–165.
- Galinsky, Karl. Augustan Culture: An Interpretive Introduction, Princeton University Press, Princeton, New Jersey, 1996. pp. 53, 120-121.
- Hanfmann, George M.A. Roman Art: A Modern Survey of the Art of Imperial Rome. W.W. Norton & Company, Inc., New York, 1975, pp. 248–249
- Horace: The Odes and Epodes. Loeb Classical Library. Great Britain, 1914. Odes III, 5.
- Internet: https://web.archive.org/web/20050325040449/http://etext.lib.virginia.edu/users/morford/augimage.html
- Pollini, John. "Ideology, Rhetorical imagery and the creation of a dynastic narrative", in Narrative and Event in Ancient Art, Peter J.Holliday, ed. (Cambridge Studies in New Art History) 1993.
- Ramage, Nancy H. and Andrew Ramage. Roman Art: Romulus to Constantine. Harry N. Abrams, Inc., New York, 1991. pp. 106–107.
- Schäfer, Jürgen. Die Gemma Augustea (Anfang 1. Jh. n. Chr.) Inv. A 158, uni-muenster.de (1999).
- Stokstad, Marilyn. Art History: Volume One. Harry N. Abrams, Inc., New York, 1995. p. 249.
- Zanker, Paul. The Power of Images in the Age of Augustus. Ann Arbor: University of Michigan Press, 1988.
