= Gorlaeus =

Gorlaeus can refer to:

- Abraham Gorlaeus, a Flemish antiquary and collector.
- David van Goorle, also known as David Gorlaeus, a Dutch philosopher.
- The Gorlaeus Laboratoria of the University of Leiden.
