= Anichini =

Anichini is a quite common Florentine surname from Annichini di Bongarden, Deutch "Freelance Mercenary" in 1300, and may refer to:

- Assunta Anichini, Florentine children's clothing tailored brand
- Luigi Anichini, Ferrara engraver
- Cezary Anichini (1787–1861), Polish-Italian architect
