= Luigi Pichler =

German-Italian gemcutter

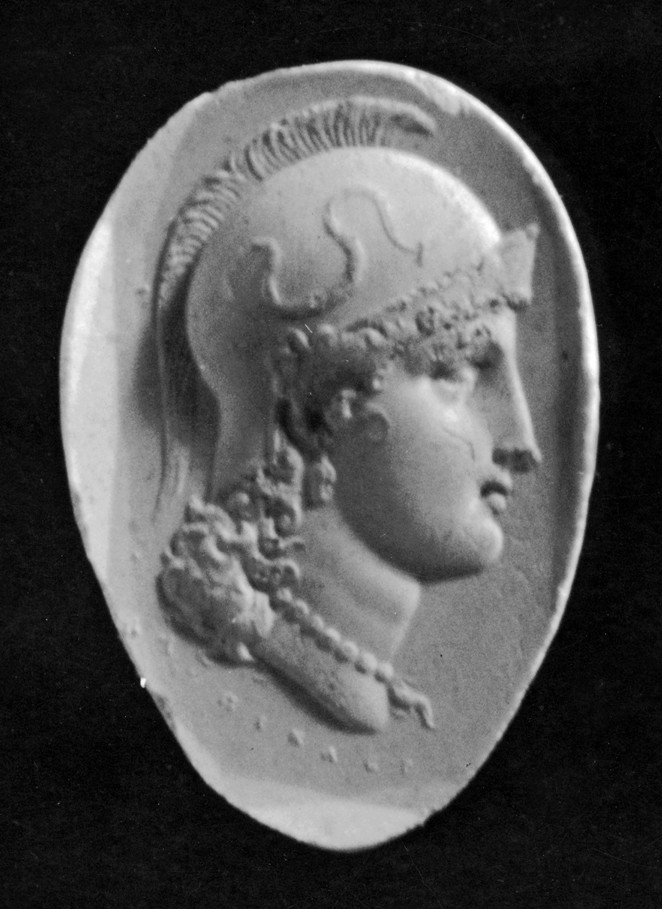
Intaglio of the Head of Athena, Walters Art Museum

Luigi Pichler (January 31, 1773 in Rome – March 13, 1854 in Rome) was a German-Italian artist in engraved gems.

Son of Anton Pichler and half-brother and student of Giovanni Pichler, Luigi was an apprentice to his greatly renowned 39-year older brother and painter Domenico de Angelis. He travelled to Vienna, where he, in 1818, was made professor of gem-engraving at the Vienna Academy of Fine Arts, and where he, working for Francis I, created replicas of some of the most famous gems in Austria as part of the Vienna Cabinet, a gift for Pope Pius VII. His works are almost exclusively intaglio, and he created many copies of his brother's and father's work. In 1850 he turned back to Rome, where he died in 1854.

His works include a head of Ajax, the gods Apollo, Mars, Venus, Cupid, and Psyche, a head of Julius Cæsar; as well as two heads of Jesus.
