= Pyrgoteles =

Ancient Greek artesan

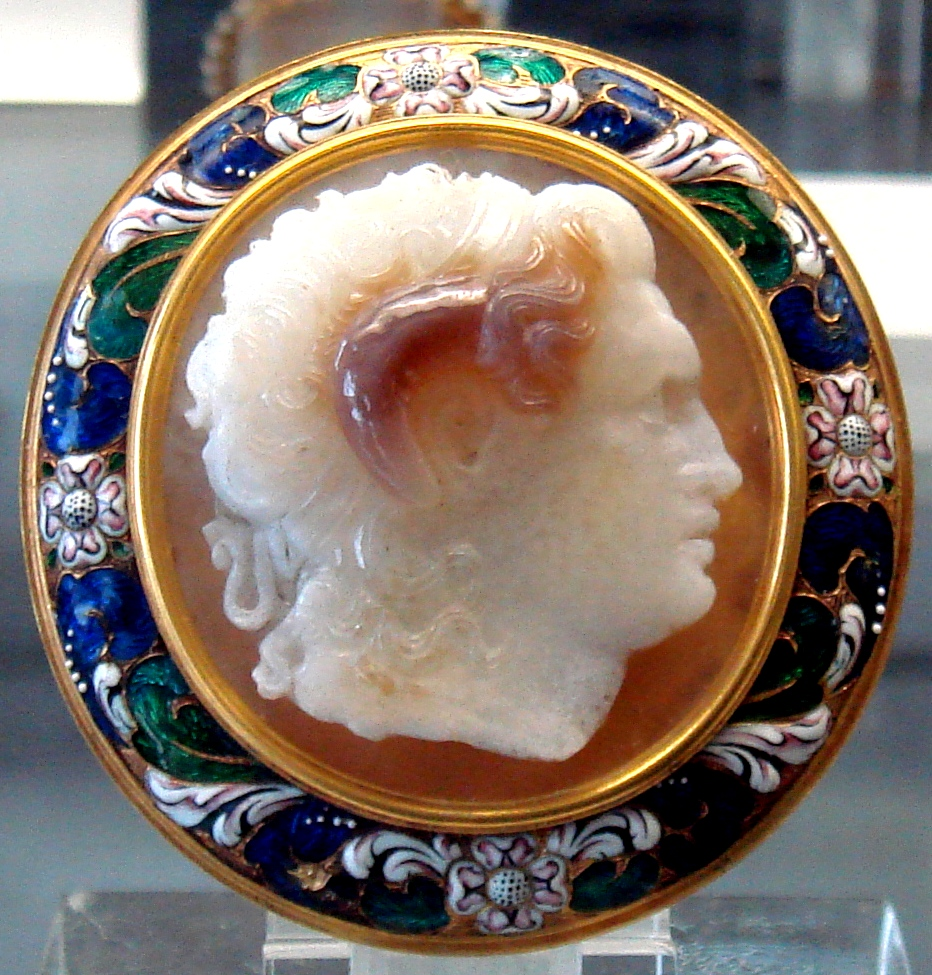
Alexander Cameo

Pyrgoteles (Ancient Greek: Πυργοτέλης) was one of the most celebrated gem-engravers of ancient Greece, living in the latter half of the 4th century BC. The esteem in which he was held may be inferred from an edict of Alexander the Great, which placed him on a level with Apelles and Lysippos, by naming him as the only artist who was permitted to engrave signet rings for the king. (Plin. H. N. vii. 37. s. 38, xxxvii. 1. s. 4.)

== Works ==
Pyrgoteles was one of the three court artists authorized to depict Alexander the Great's figure in art (the others being Apelles for painting and Lysippos for sculpture). Pliny the Elder (Natural History 37.8) adds that Alexander had issued an edict forbidding anyone to engrave his image on emeralds, and other gems, outside of Pyrgoteles.

Unfortunately, every thing else respecting Pyrgoteles is left to the unknown, due to the neglect of ancient writers and modern forgers, lack of remains, and so many copies coming out of that same time period. There are several works under the name of Pyrgoteles, but of these the best known have been demonstrated by Winckelmann to be forgeries, and very few of the others have any signs to authenticity due to the mass production of pieces with the name Pyrgoteles on them or just a "P".

Despite the large impact that Pyrgoteles contributed to Alexander's imagery in the ancient world, we are today unable to identify all that much of his actual output. No signed pieces of his survive, or are able to be deemed authentic; however, when comparing sources this seems to be up in the air. With some sourcing speaking of his forgeries as if authentic and others only giving Prygoteles the label of gem engraver to Alexander. Various texts suggest that next to gem-engraving, Pyrgoteles was responsible for coin dies as well, and coinage was one of the main forms of propaganda and marketing of images in the ancient times. Coinage was the standard medium for diffusing royal imagery in the Hellenistic period and allowed emperors to be remembered and altered to fit the aspects of culture in said time periods. Alexander never had his actual portrait cut on his coins during his lifetime; however, after his image was highly produced in the later years after his death, though it is possible that Pyrgoteles was responsible for designing Alexander's first coin dies, which depict Herakles, Alexander's patron god, in dedication to Alexander. Following Alexander's premature death, Pyrgoteles would have most likely continued his career in the courts of his successors, which we know as Lysippos and Apelles, who shows up in much of the literature pertaining to Prygoteles, and are often associated with being his disciples and predecessors.

== Coin Dies ==
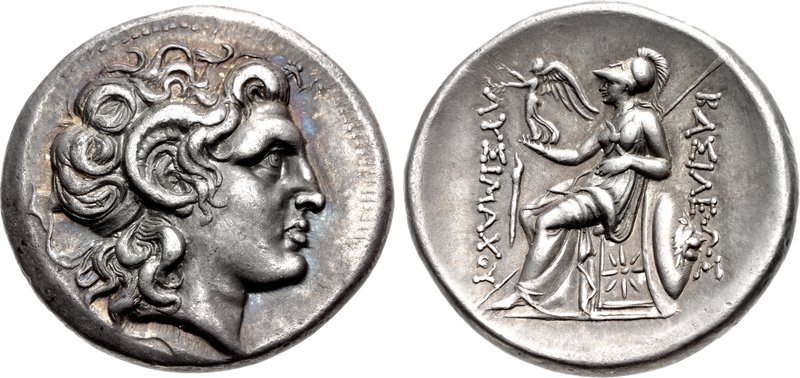
Lysinachus Coin, Alexander depiction.

In terms of work he did outside of engraving for Alexander, Pyrgoteles is often associated with the so-called Lysimachi, a long series of silver tetradrachms and gold octodrachms, or in other words, gold and silver coins issued by King Lysimachos of Thrace starting in 297/6 BC and made by Pyrgoteles. Lysimachos was at the time emerging victorious from the wars against his fellow-claimants of Alexander's political and territorial legacy, and he chose to illustrate his coins with a posthumous portrait of their common predecessor, giving an image of success, victory, and strong Greek values. The obverse of the coins shows the head of the deified Alexander, wearing the royal diadem and the ram's horn, a direct allusion to his being the son of the Egyptian deity of Zeus Ammon, also showing him clean shaven to show his youthfulness, and possible naive state. This paying respect to Alexander carries the implicit connotation of Lysimachos’ own regal and military qualities, admirably demonstrated through his victory at the crucial battle of Ipsos in 301 BC. As it appears on the coins, Alexander's head comes close enough to Plutarch's descriptions and the extant marble heads in the Lysippan tradition, for it to be quite possible that Pyrgoteles was responsible for the design of the Lysimachi, presumably working for the Thracian court after the dissolution of Alexander's empire, but again there is no proof of Pyrgoteles being the master mind behind these coins for King Lysimachos.

== Forgeries ==
In modern times this famous name has been engraved as a forged signature on ancient gems; the gem cutter Alessandro Cesari (16th century) adopted the name of his famous predecessor and signed his works accordingly. The name inscription P. can be found. This causes much confusion when it comes to identifying authentic works of Prygoteles.

== Impact ==
Many of these catalogued works were from the Greeks as well as the Etruscans. The Greeks inherited seal engraving, along with other accomplishments from people and travelers of the near East. Apart from the penchant for the scarab form in the sixth century, the art quickly Hellenized and became a favorite medium for virtuosity. The Greek gem cutters introduced the scarab to Italy, where is continued to be adopted to Etruria, and the Etruscans eventually tagged along as well. Gem engraving and coins were a new curated art form that, much like most Greek art, was admired and copied and taken on to show politics, mythology and historical events.
