= Christopher Hewetson =

Irish sculptor

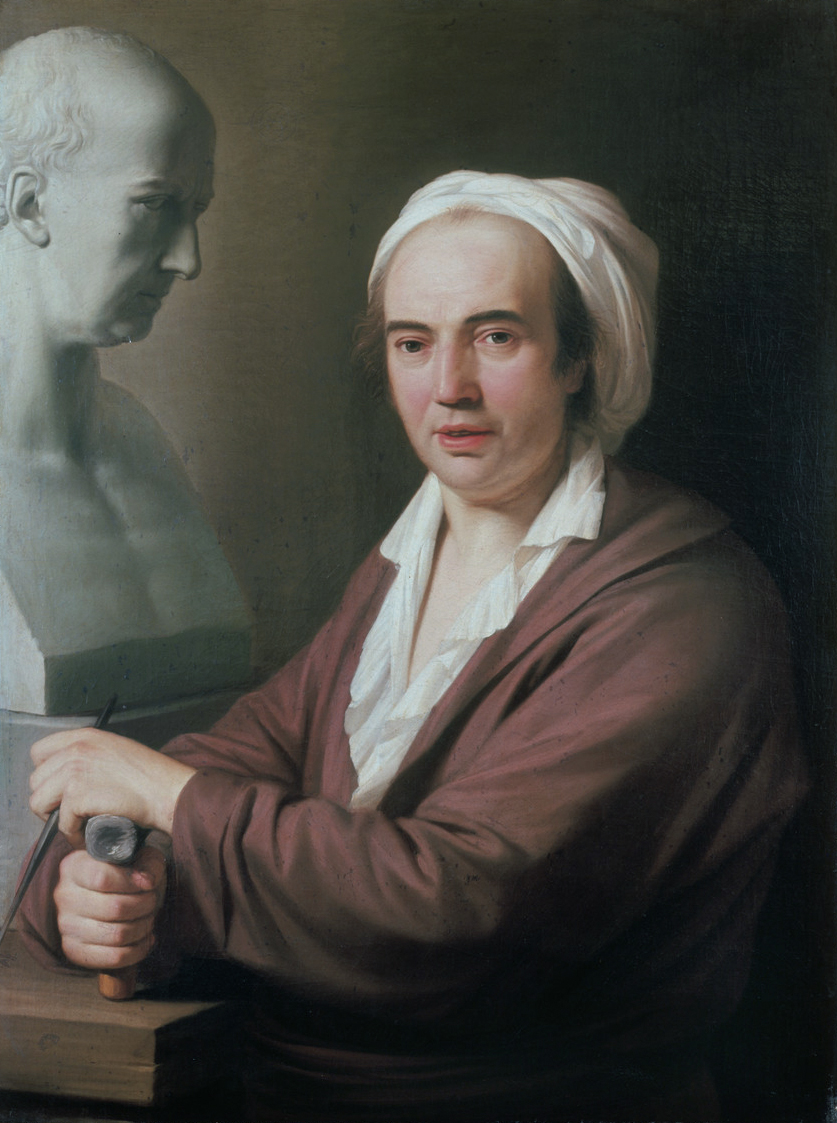
- Born: 1737; Thomastown, County Kilkenny, Ireland
- Died: 1798 (aged 60–61); Rome, Roman Republic (now Italy)
- Resting place: Protestant Cemetery, Rome
- Education: Kilkenny College
- Known for: Bust sculptures
- Notable work: Bust of Pope Clement XIV

Christopher Hewetson (c.1737–1798) was a neoclassical sculptor of marble, terracotta and bronze portrait busts. Born in Ireland, he was active in Rome.

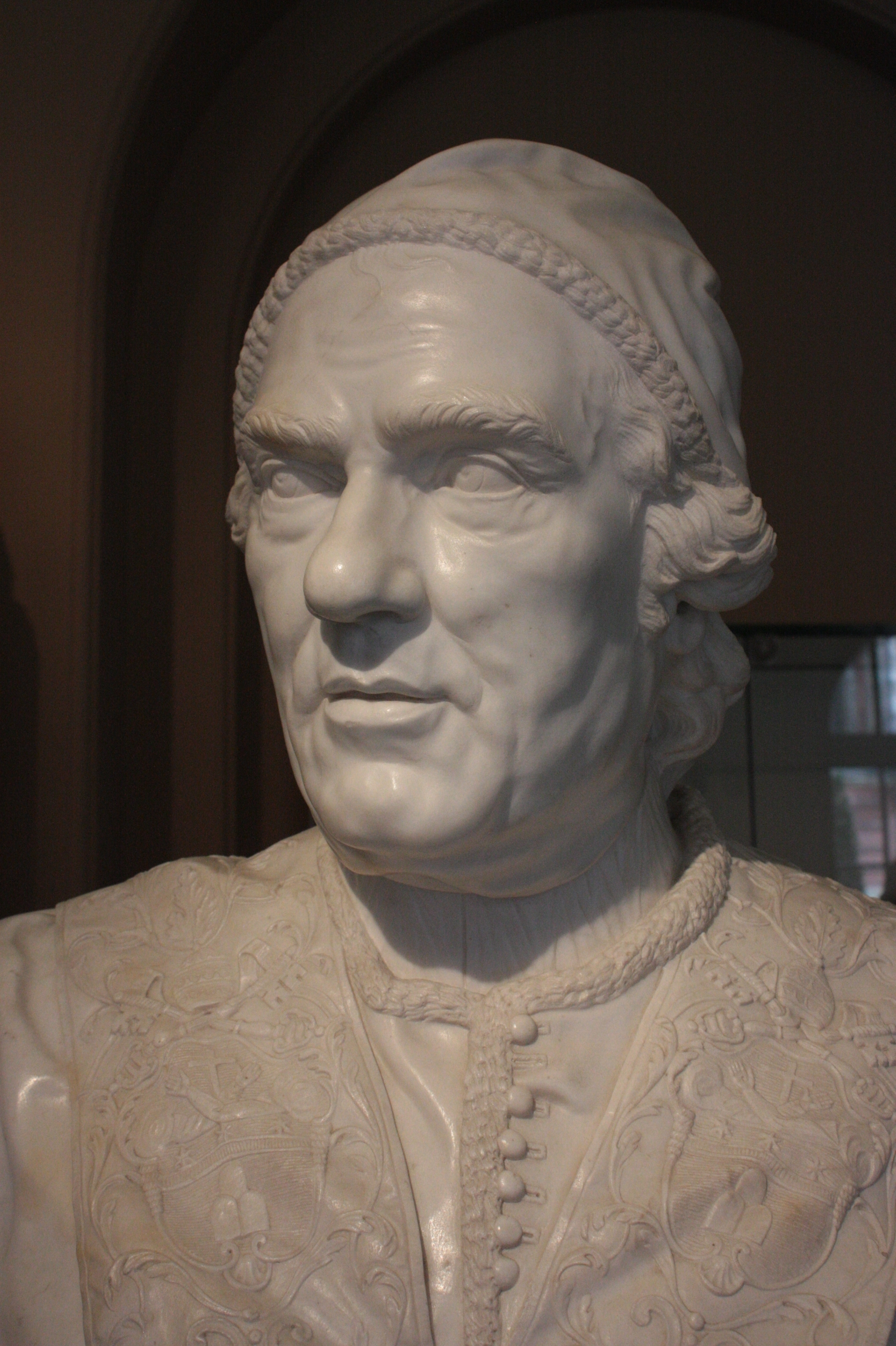
Pope Clement XIV by Christopher Hewetson, 1773, Victoria and Albert Museum

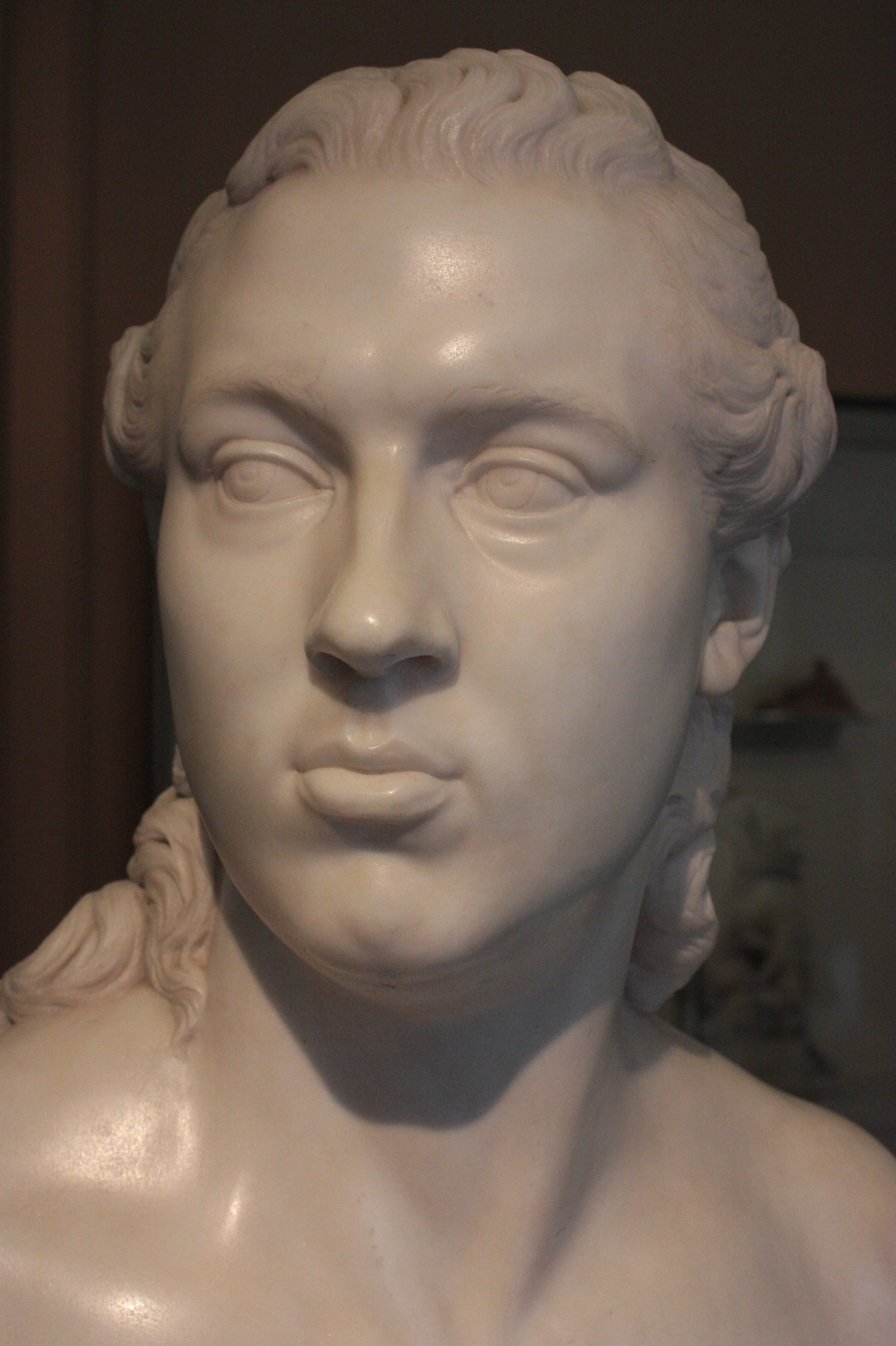
Thomas Mansel Talbot by Christopher Hewetson, c.1773, Victoria and Albert Museum

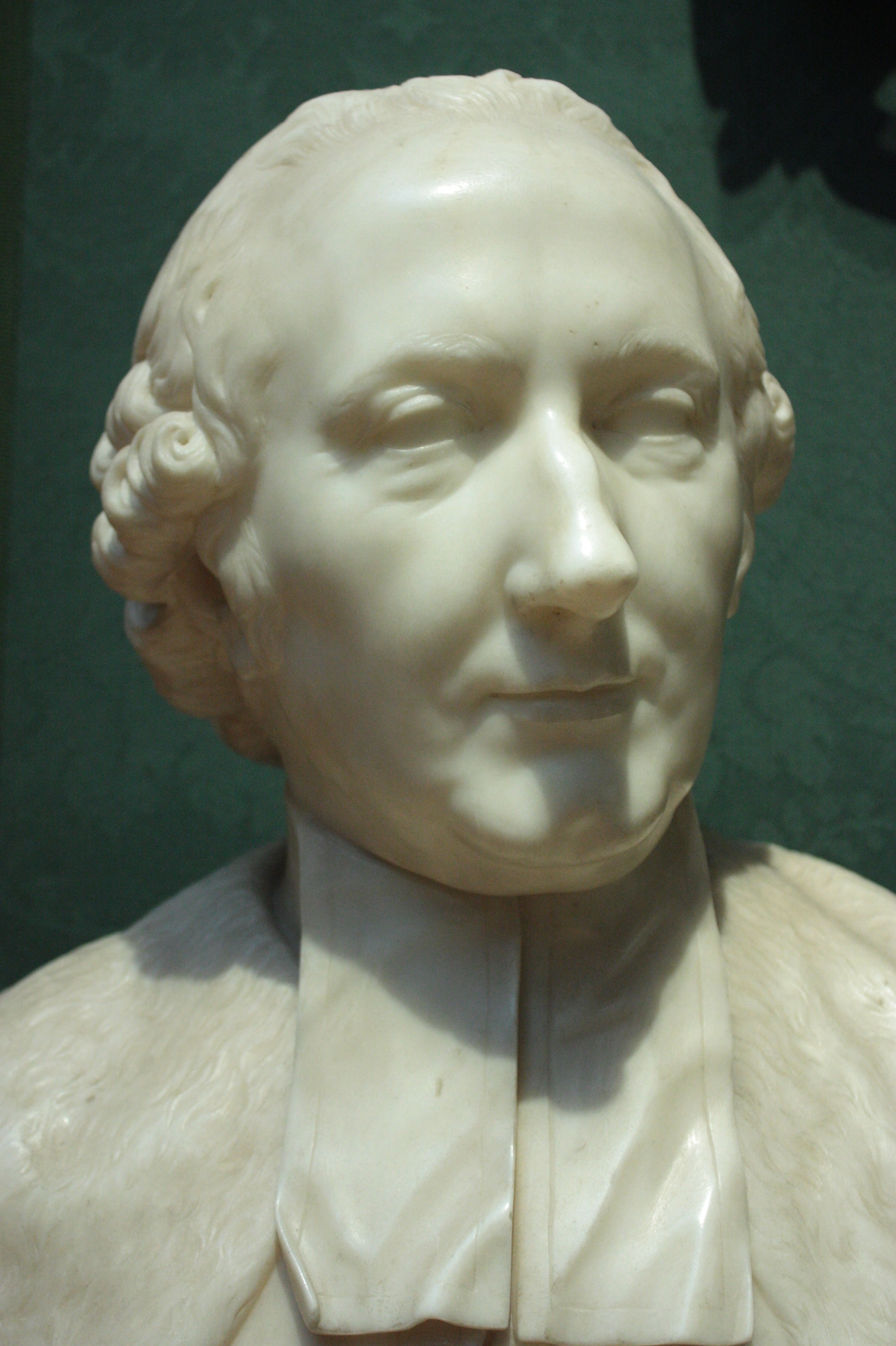
Frederick Hervey by Christopher Hewetson, 1778, National Portrait Gallery, London

== Biography ==
Hewetson was born in Thomastown, County Kilkenny, Ireland, in 1737/8 the son of Lieutenant Christopher Hewetson whose ancestry was from Yorkshire. His father died in 1744 when Christopher was only 7, leaving his mother Eleanor with four young children to raise.

He studied at Kilkenny College, where his uncle the Rev. Dr Thomas Hewetson was headmaster, and in Dublin under John van Nost the younger.

In 1765 he arrived in Rome with the American painter Henry Benbridge. He remained in Rome for the remainder of his life with the exception of two brief visits to Naples in 1766 and 1797.

With the assistance of Thomas Jenkins, Hewetson received commissions from numerous British and Irishmen visiting Rome on the Grand Tour. He also sculpted busts of a number of local churchmen. Antonio Canova was at Rome during part of Hewetson's stay. The rivalry between the two sculptors emerged in two great commissions, the Tomb for Pope Clement XIV and the Tomb for Pope Clement XIII, both won by Canova.

In the last phase of his career Hewetson held a two-sided production: he sculpted copies after the Antique - sometimes in marble, more often in plaster - as well as portrait-busts. His workshop was in Via San Sebastianello, very close to Piazza di Spagna. Hewetson never married. He died at Rome in 1798, where he was buried in the Protestant Cemetery. His inventory after death, recently found, revealed the presence of 12 busts, some left unfinished, and of a considerable number of copies after the antique.

== Works ==
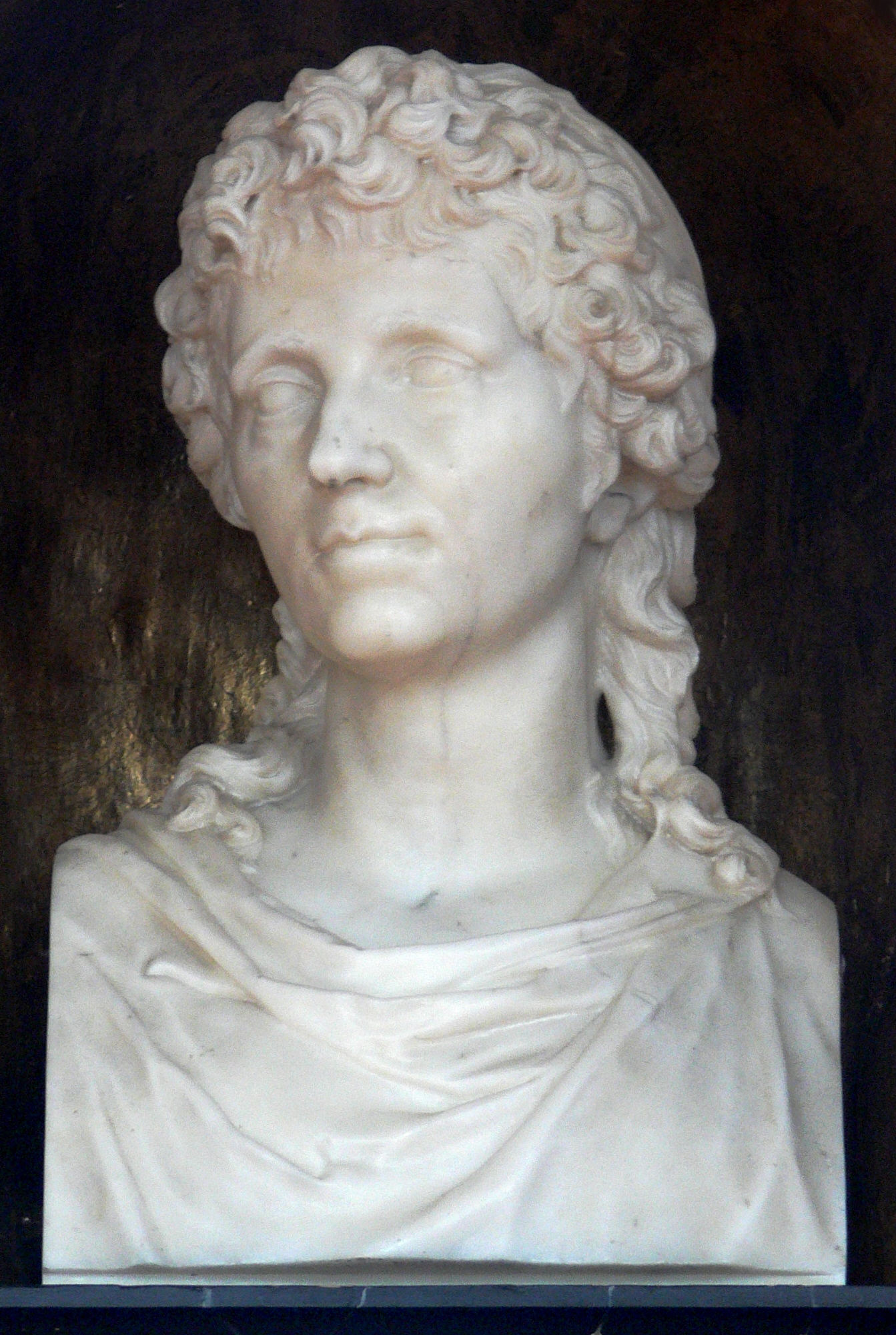
Christopher Hewetson: Marble bust of Angelica Kauffman in the parish church of Schwarzenberg, Austria

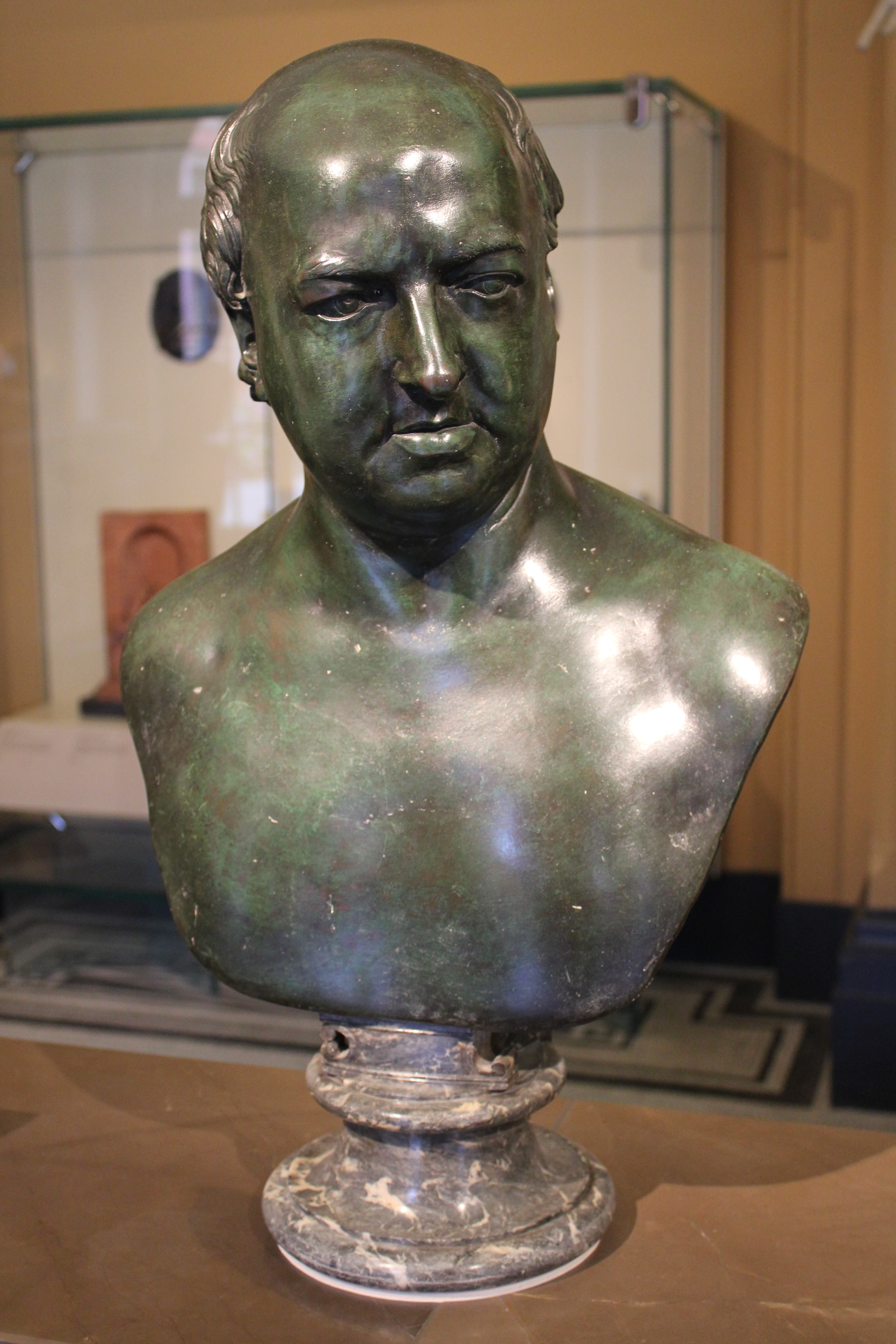
Christopher Hewetson: Bust of Sir Thomas Gascoigne, at the Victoria and Albert Museum, London.

- Charles Towneley (marble bust, 1769), Department of Medieval & Modern Europe, British Museum,
- Sir Watkin Williams-Wynn, 4th Baronet (bust, 1769), National Gallery of Ireland, Dublin
- Pope Clement XIV (marble busts, two in 1772, one in 1776), several almost identical copies which at various times have been in Ammerdown (Somerset); Gorhambury (Herts); Beningbrough Hall (Yorks); Penrice and Margam castles, near Swansea; the Victoria and Albert Museum, London, and the Center of British Art of Yale University (New Haven, USA)
- Thomas Mansel Talbot (marble bust, 1773), Victoria and Albert Museum, London
- Thomas Mansel Talbot (chalk bust), Museo Civico, Bassano del Grappa, Italy.
- Luigi III Gonzaga it:Luigi III Gonzaga (marble bust, 1776), Museo di Roma in Palazzo Braschi, Rome
- Maria Maddalena Morelli it:Maria Maddalena Morelli (bust, 1776), Museo di Roma in Palazzo Braschi, Rome
- Frederick Hervey, 4th Earl of Bristol (marble bust, c. 1778), National Portrait Gallery, London
- Sir Thomas Gascoigne, 8th Baronet of Parlington (bronze bust, c. 1778), Victoria and Albert Museum, London
- Martha Swinburne (marble medallion in funerary monument, 1779), Chiesa di San Tommaso, Rome
- Unknown Gentleman-Robert Adams (c. 1780), Fine Arts Museums of San Francisco
- José Nicolás de Azara (bronze bust, c. 1780), Institut de France, Paris
- José Nicolás de Azara (marble bust, 1781), Protomoteca Capitolina, Rome
- Anton Raphael Mengs (marble bust, 1781), Protomoteca Capitolina, Rome
- Gavin Hamilton (bust, 1784), University Art Collection, Glasgow
- Thomas Brereton-Westfaling, 1740 - 1814 (c. 1785), The Louvre, Paris
- Richard Baldwin (marble monument, 1784), Examination Hall, Trinity College, Dublin
- Cardinal Giovanni Battista Rezzonico (marble monument, 1787), Chiesa di San Nicola in Carcere, Rome
- Gottfried Leibniz (bust, 1787 - 1790), Reception hall of the Technologie Centrum, Hannover
- Anton Raphael Mengs (bronze bust cast by Francesco Righetti, 1792), Clark Art Institute, Williamstown, Massachusetts
- Count Anton Günther of Oldenburg (bust, white marble, 1794, part of the Count's monument), vestibule of St. Lambert Church, Oldenburg, Germany.
- Giovanni Pichler (marble bust, 1797), Museo Capitolino, Rome
- Thomas Westfaling (bust), St Mary, Ross-on-Wye, Herefordshire, U.K.
- Mr and Mrs Henry Swinburne (bust), Gascoigne bequest at Lotherton Hall, Leeds
- Alcyone and Ceyx (relief), Gascoigne bequest at Lotherton Hall, Leeds

== Bibliography ==
- P. Coen, "Christopher Hewetson: nuovi documenti, nuove interpretazioni" (i.e. C.H.: new documents, new interpretations), in Bollettino d'Arte, 97, 2012, pp. 87–100.
- Ulrich Thieme – F. Becker, "Hewetson Cristopher", Allgemeines Lexikon der Bildenden Kunstler, (Leipzig, 1924), vol. XVII, p. 13.
- C. Pietrangeli, a cura di G. Incisa della Rocchetta, Vincenzo Monti a Roma, exhibition catalogue, Rome, Palazzo Braschi, Roma, 1955, pp. 47, 50, tav. VII.
- V. Martinelli, C. Pietrangeli, La Protomoteca Capitolina, Roma, 1955, pp. 8, 36, 73, 78, tavv. VIII e 2.
- Barnes, J. "An unknown bust by Chrisopher Hewetson", Antologia di Belle Arti, s.s., 52–55, 1996, pp. 166–169.
- Breffny, B., and C. Hewetson. "Christopher Hewetson (1737-1798), Irish sculptor". Irish Arts Review, III(3), 52–75.
- Hodgkinson, Terence. "Christopher Hewetson: An Irish Sculptor in Rome", Walpole Society 34 (1952–1954): 42–54 at 50 and pl. XVIIIc
- Anne Crookshank in Brian de Breffny, ed., The Irish World: The Art and Culture of the Irish People, (New York, 1977) 146, 147, and 170.
- Brian de Breffny, ed., Ireland: A Cultural Encyclopaedia, (London, 1983) 105 - 106.
- Id., "Christopher Hewetson, Concise Biography and Preliminary Catalogue Raisonné", Irish Arts Review 3 (1986): 52 - 75, no. 17a
- Bowren, E.P., and J.J. Rischel. Art in Rome in the Eighteenth Century (Philadelphia and Houston, 2000), 228–230, 254–255.
- Esdaile, K.A. "Christopher Hewetson and his monument to Dr. Baldwin in Trinity College, Dublin", Journal of the Royal Society of Antiquaries of Ireland (December 1947): 134–135.
