= Anton Pichler =

German-Italian gemcutter

Anton Pichler (April 12, 1697 – September 14, 1779) was a Tyrolean goldsmith and artist of engraved gems, and the son of a doctor.

Pichler was born in Brixen. He studied in Naples and worked for the Bourbon court later moving, in 1743, to Rome, where he lived to his death. Pichler's gems include: Antigone and Ismene before the Temple of the Furies, the Father of the Returning from Thebes advisors (a large Onyx), and Priamos at the Feet of Achilles (after an owners concept); a great bust of Homer; the Head of Julius Caesar; Meleager, after the Statue in the Vatican; the Bacchanal of Michelangelo, the signet ring.

Pichler died in Rome, aged 82. His sons, Giovanni and Luigi, were also famous gem cutters.
