= Giuseppe Antonio Torricelli =

Italian sculptor

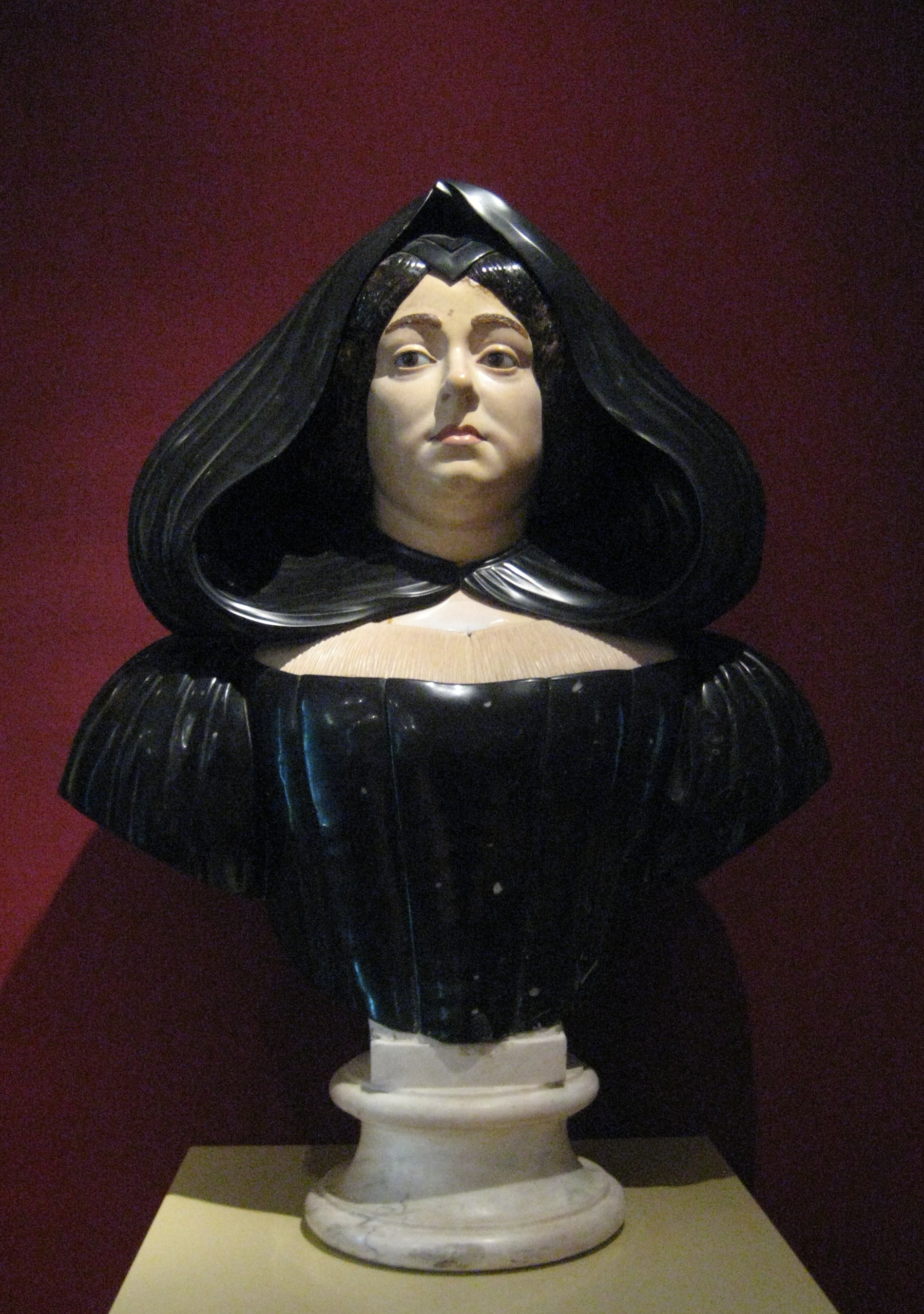
Vittoria della Rovere

Giuseppe Antonio Torricelli (1662–1719) was an Italian sculptor and gem-engraver of the late Baroque active in Florence, often using colorful and semi-precious pietra dura, a type of workmanship that became a specialty of Florence. He initially trained with Gaetano Giulio Zumbo. During his lifetime, worked under the supervision of Giovanni Battista Foggini, the master sculptor of the duchy. His masterpiece is the elaborate bust of Vittoria della Rovere (made from chalcedony (face), sardonyx (pupils), Sicilian jasper (lips), and black touchstone (bodice and veil). This project alone took nearly two decades to complete (1696–1713). It ultimately lacks the majesty of marble, and has the appearance of a wax museum portrait. It is found presently in Museo degli Argenti in Florence.

== Sources ==
- Gli Ultimi Medici, Review by Peter Cannon-Brookes, in The Burlington Magazine, 1974, p 777-80.
- Bruce Boucher (1998). Italian Baroque Sculpture. Thames & Hudson, World of Art. pp. 81–82.
