= Giovanni Pichler =

Giovanni Pichler (Born 10 January 1734 in Naples; died 25 January 1791 in Rome) was a German-Italian artist in engraved gems.

== Biography ==
Giovanni Pichler was born on 10 January 1734 in Naples, where his father, the Tyrolean gem-engraver, Anton Pichler, had settled. He was the brother of Luigi Pichler, who also became a gem-engraver. In 1743 his father moved to Rome. Giovanni was educated by his father in classical methods, and apprenticed to Domenico Corvi

He cut, after 15 years, a Hercules in Combat with the Nemean Lions, a generally admired piece. His gems, both recessed and embossed, are of outstanding clarity and sharpness and he was one of the most sought after engravers of his age, leaving him with a prolific 379 pieces to his name. He also worked in pastel painting.

In 1790 he produced a catalogue of 200 examples of his work.

Johann Joseph (Giuseppe) Pichler, stepbrother of Giovanni and Luigi Pichler, born in 1760 in Rome, was a skillful lapidary.

Giovanni Pichler died on 25 January 1791 in Rome. A portrait bust of Pichler by the sculptor, Christopher Hewetson is conserved in the Musei Capitolini, Rome.

== Literature ==
- I. Bignamini, C. Hornsby, Digging And Dealing In Eighteenth-Century Rome (2010), p. 316-317
- G. Tassinari, 'I ritratti dei viaggiatori del Grand Tour sugli intaglio ed i cammei di Giovanni Pichler', in Bolletino del Centro Interuniversitario di ricerche sul viaggio in Italia; 26:1 (2005), p. 11-79
- G. Seidmann, 'The Grand Tourist's favourite souvenirs: cameos and intaglios', in RSA Journal (1996), p. 63-66
- Hermann Rollett: Die drei Meister der Gemmoglyptik Antonio, Giovanni und Luigi Pichler: eine biographisch-kunstgeschichtliche Darstellung (1884. Vienna)
- Catalogo d'impronti cavati da gemme incise dal Cavaliere Giovanni Pichler ... (1790)
