= Gonzaga Cameo =

Hellenistic engraved gem

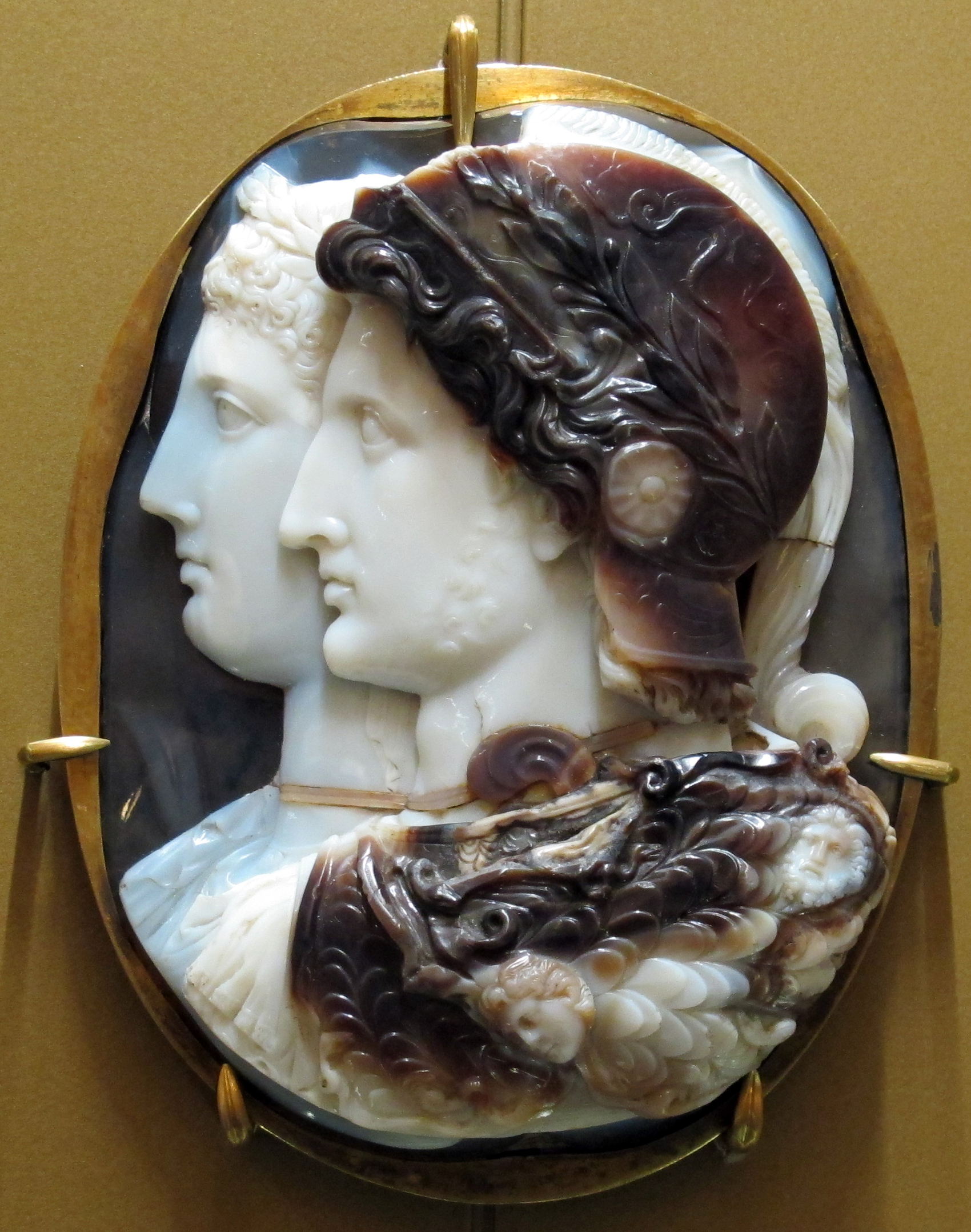
- The Gonzaga Cameo in the Hermitage Museum
- Height: 15.7 cm
- Width: 11.8 cm
- Created: possibly 3rd century BC
- Present location: Saint Petersburg, Russia

The Gonzaga Cameo is a Hellenistic engraved gem; a cameo of the capita jugata variety cut out from the three layers of an Indian sardonyx, dating from perhaps the 3rd century BC. It was a centrepiece of the Gonzaga collection of antiquities, first described in a 1542 inventory of Isabella d'Este's collection as representing Augustus and Livia. The figures were later identified as Alexander the Great and Olympias, Germanicus and Agrippina the Elder, Nero and Agrippina the Younger, and many other famous couples of antiquity. The male figure on the cameo is clad in the attributes of Alexander, including a laurel-wreathed helmet, and wears a gorgoneion. His other aegis represents a bearded head, probably that of Zeus Ammon. The man's laurel wreath is crowned by a snake which suggests the uraeus. The contrasting male and female profiles were in all probability intended to suggest Zeus and Hera. The brown necklace is a later addition masking that the cameo was, at some point, broken in half.

== Owners ==
Young Peter Paul Rubens, then in the employ of the Mantuan Duke, admired the Gonzaga cameo as the finest in existence. During the War of the Mantuan Succession, it was carried off by the imperial troops to Vienna and was preserved in the Prague Castle treasury through the Thirty Years' War. At the end of the conflict, the Swedes marched into Prague and looted the imperial treasury.

Several years later the cameo resurfaced in the collection of Queen Christina of Sweden. There is little record of its subsequent history. It is assumed that the Queen took it with her to Italy, bequeathing it to her favourite, Cardinal Decio Azzolini. It was subsequently acquired, with the rest of Christina's art collection, by Livio Odescalchi, Duke of Bracciano and nephew of Innocent XI.

In 1794, the cameo was part of Pius VI's collection in Vatican. The invading French took it with them to Paris where it entered the collection of Napoleon and Empress Joséphine. After Napoleon's downfall, Alexander I of Russia paid a visit to the Château de Malmaison and offered Joséphine every assistance in his power. As a sign of gratitude she presented the cameo to the Tsar.

Since then, the so-called Malmaison cameo has been kept in the Hermitage Museum in Saint Petersburg. In Vienna, there is a rival Hellenistic cameo, of lesser quality, which the Habsburgs also described as the "Gonzaga cameo", probably on assumption that it had not been stolen by the Swedes in 1648. This results in considerable confusion between the two.

== Subject ==
Set against the dark layer, their majestic white profiles, hers soft and feminine, his decisive and virile, are the embodiment of the authority that will bring prosperity to their subjects.

— Diana Scarisbrick

The cameo shows the profiles of a man and a woman which conceivably possess family likeness. This capita jugata type of portrait, showing two superimposed profiles, is known from the coins issued by Ptolemy II Philadelphus in Hellenistic Egypt. Such portraits show Ptolemy with his sister and wife, Arsinoe II. Ptolemy was the first Hellenistic ruler to marry his sister; and it was at his court that the image of the twin deities, theoi adelphoi, gained currency. To shore up the identification, it has been argued that the woman's head on the cameo is covered with a sort of bridal veil.

J. J. Pollitt of Yale University believes that it is the Vienna cameo that represents Ptolemy and Arsinoe. As for the Saint Petersburg cameo, Pollitt argues that the sharply defined quality of the "neoclassical" workmanship indicates a later date than is commonly recognized. He identifies the figures as Tiberius and Livia represented "in very generalized form so that they would simultaneously evoke the imagery of a Ptolemaic cameo and, through it, the imagery of Alexander".

== Bibliography ==
- de Grummond, Nancy T. (October 1974). "The Real Gonzaga Cameo". American Journal of Archaeology. 78 (4): 427–429. doi:10.2307/502757. JSTOR 502757.
