= Charles Christian Reisen =

English gem-engraver

Charles Christian Reisen (1680 – 15 December 1725) was an English gem-engraver.

== Life ==
He was born in the parish of St. Clement Danes, London, the eldest son of Christian Reisen, a goldsmith, of Trondheim in Norway. The elder Reisen, leaving Norway, visited Scotland about 1664, and worked for two years at Aberdeen for a goldsmith named Melvin. In September 1666 he came to London, and began to work as an engraver of seals. He was afterwards confined to the Tower for four years on suspicion of engraving dies for coining, but was discharged without a trial, and died in England about 1700, leaving a widow and several children.

Charles Christian Reisen, who had been instructed as a gem and seal engraver under his father's instruction, became the support of the family, being mainly employed in cutting crests and arms. He gained little from an introduction to Prince George of Denmark, but attracted the attention of Robert Harley, Earl of Oxford, who permitted him to study in his library and museum. In course of time Reisen formed a collection of medals, prints, drawings, and books, and was chosen director of Sir Godfrey Kneller's academy. On the trial of Bishop Francis Atterbury, he was examined as an expert as to the impression of a seal. Horace Walpole was another of his patrons, and for him he made several cornelian intaglios. Reisen received commissions from Denmark, Germany, and France, as well as from Englishmen. Horace Walpole called him "a great artist", but Charles William King considered his intaglios deficient in finish.

Among Reisen's intaglios - he did not attempt cameos - were specimens bearing the heads of Faustina the Elder, Faustina the Younger, Lucilla, Charles I of England, and Charles XII of Sweden. Glaus (d. 1739), Smart, and Seaton are named as his pupils.

George Vertue describes Reisen as a jovial and humorous man who, being illiterate, had, by conversing with men of various countries, "composed a dialect so droll and diverting that it grew into a kind of use among his acquaintance, and he threatened to publish a dictionary of it". Reisen was usually known in England as 'Christian' and 'Christian's mazzard' was a joke among his friends. Sir James Thornhill drew an extempore profile of him, and Matthew Prior added the distich:

This, drawn by candle light and hazard,
Was meant to show Charles Christian's mazzard.

A portrait of Reisen was painted by John Vanderbank, and was engraved by Freeman in Walpole's 'Anecdotes'. Other engravings by Bretherton and G. White are mentioned by Henry Bromley.

Reisen died of gout on 15 December 1725 in the neighbourhood of Covent Garden, London, where he had chiefly lived, though he had also (about 1720) a house at Putney, nicknamed 'Bearsdenhall'. He was buried in St Paul's, Covent Garden, on the north side next to the steps. He appointed his friend, Sir James Thornhill, one of his executors, and, dying a bachelor, left the bulk of his fortune to an unmarried sister who lived with him, and a portion to his brother John.

== Notes ==
Attribution

This article incorporates text from a publication now in the public domain: "Reisen, Charles Christian". Dictionary of National Biography. London: Smith, Elder & Co. 1885–1900.
