= Abraham Gorlaeus =

Dutch antiquary of Flemish origin

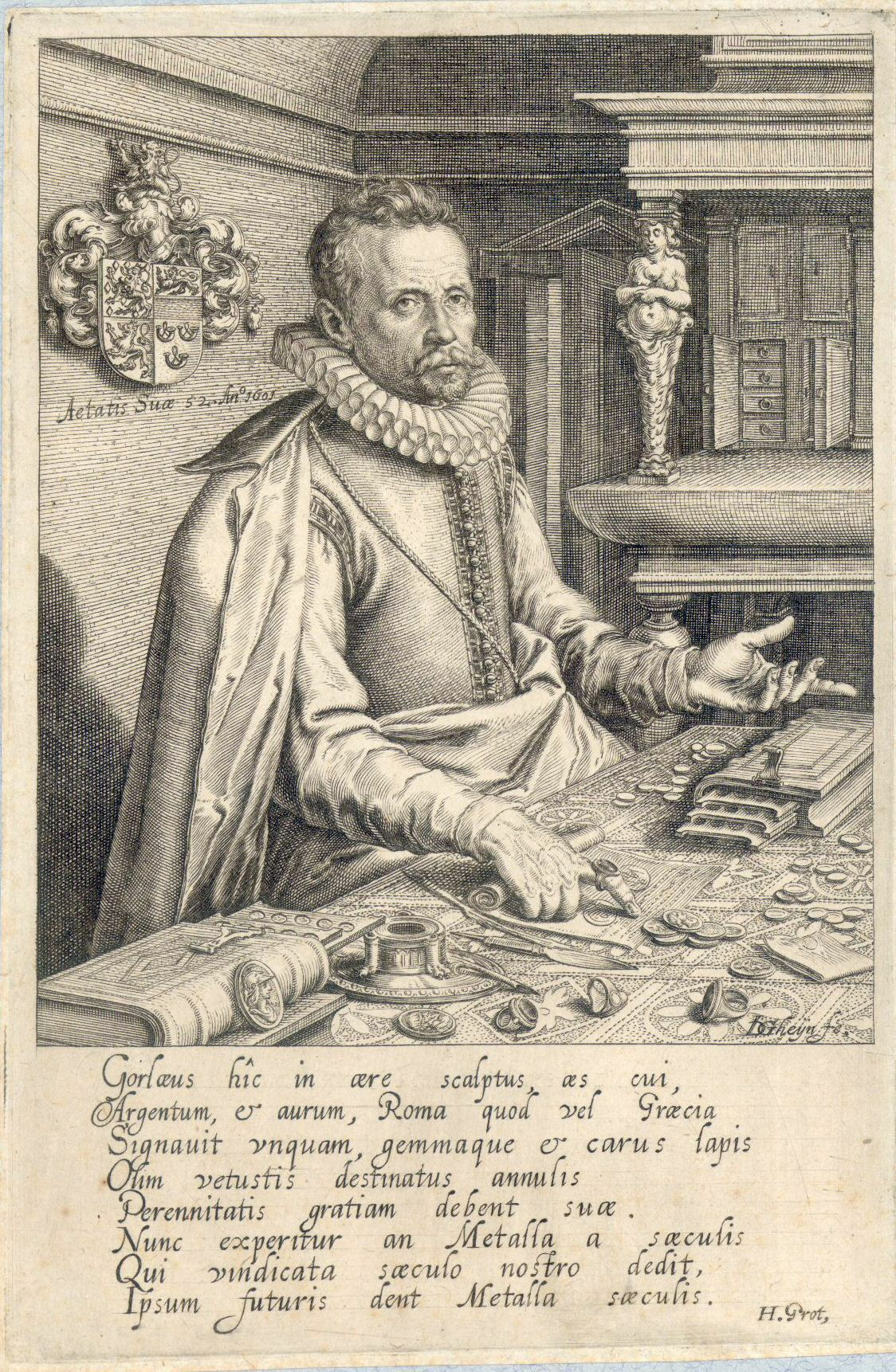
Abraham van Goorle, aged 52, copper engraving by Jacob de Gheyn I

Abraham van Goorle or, Latinized, Abraham Gorlaeus (ca. 1549 – 1608) was a Dutch antiquary of Flemish origin.

Gorlaeus was born in Antwerp as the son of Jacob Godevaertsz van Ghoorle and Willemken Heijmolen, but fled as a teenager with his brother David to the Dutch Republic. He lived in Utrecht and already in 1570 held an influential position under the employment of stadtholder Adolf van Nieuwenaar. He married Susanna Patersson, with whom he had three children in the 1580s. In 1595 he moved to Delft where he remained until his death on 11 October 1608 and where he was buried in the Oude Kerk. The philosopher and theologian David van Goorle Jr. was the son of his brother David.

== Importance ==
Gorlaeus published Dactyliotheca, the catalog of engraved gems in his cabinet of curiosities. It was the first extensive repertory of Greco-Roman intaglio gems. Such gems had been avidly collected for the previous century, at first in Italy.

In 1609, the cabinet was purchased on behalf of Henry, Prince of Wales, an isolated early example of English interest in engraved gems. Gorlaeus' Dactyliotheca remained useful for the rest of the century; it was republished by Jakob Gronovius in 1695, as part of his Thesaurus Graecarum antiquitatum.

In his cabinet of curiosities, Gorlaeus had a collection of rare shells, which was of sufficient interest to be purchased by the States-General of the Dutch Republic as a present for Marie de' Medici, for 9000 guilders.

== Works ==
- Dactyliotheca seu annulorum sigillarium quorum apud Priscos tam Graecos quam Romanos usus…, 1601 (in Latin)
- Thesaurus numismatum Romanorum. Sive numi aurei, argentei, aerei ad familias Romanas spectantes usque ad obitum Augusti, 1607 (in Latin)
