= Anichini family =

Leading gem-cutter in Venice

The Anichini family were Italian Renaissance sculptors, leading carvers of engraved gems for seals and medals in Renaissance Italy.

Francesco Anichini (fl. 1449–1526) had four sons who followed him in the art. He was the leading gem-cutter in Venice, taking commissions from Isabella d'Este and others.

His sons were:

- Alvise Anichini (dates uncertain)
- Andrea Anichini (fl. 1526–1553)
- Callisto Anichini (a. 1527–c. 1553), a jewelry-maker
- Luigi Anichini (b. 1500 x 1510, d. after 1559). Michelangelo pronounced his Interview of Alexander the Great with the high-priest at Jerusalem "the perfection of the art". His medals of Henry II of France and Pope Paul III are greatly valued.

== Bibliography ==
- Campbell, Gordon (2006), The Grove Encyclopedia of Decorative Arts, New York: Oxford University Press, ISBN 0-19-518948-5
