= David van Goorle =

Dutch philosopher and theologian

- Born: 15 January 1591; Utrecht
- Died: 21 April 1612 (aged 21)
- Other names: David Gorlaeus
- Education: University of Franeker, University of Leiden
- Known for: The particle-atom theory
- Relatives: Abraham Gorlaeus (uncle)

David van Goorle (also known under his Latinized name David Gorlaeus) (15 January 1591, Utrecht – 21 April 1612, Cornjum) was a Dutch philosopher and theologian, and one of the first modern atomists.

== Biography ==
Van Goorle was the son of David van Goorle Sr., a Protestant refugee from Antwerp, who at the time of his birth was treasurer for stadtholder Adolf van Nieuwenaar. His uncle was Abraham Gorlaeus. His mother was a Frisian noblewoman, the daughter of admiral Doecke van Martena, known for his role in the Dutch and Frisian wars of independence. Although he called himself Ultrajectinus (after his birthplace Utrecht), he grew up with his maternal grandparents in their stins in the Frisian village of Cornjum.

In 1606 he enrolled in arts at the University of Franeker; there the anti-Aristotelian professor Henri de Veen, better known under his Latinized name of Henricus de Veno (c. 1574-1613), was going to have a "decisive influence" on him. From April 1611, he studied theology at the University of Leiden; he also expressed his views on atoms in his book Idea Physicae, where he disputes the theories of Aristotle and claims that there is something as a "smallest, undividable, particle".

For the early seventeenth century these were revolutionary thoughts, and Van Goorle is regarded as one of the founders of the particle-atom theory, together with Daniel Sennert and Pierre Gassendi, to name just a few. He died at the early age of 21; on his tombstone in the church of Cornjum he is remembered as an "erudite and very intelligent young man." His larger work, Exercitationes philosophicae, was printed posthumously in 1620. It is thought that this last work influenced Henricus Regius and René Descartes.

Although Gorlaeus' name is little-known today, he was for decades an archetypal anti-Aristotelian. In 1624 Father Mersenne gives a horrifying picture of the Dutch theologian who believes—says Mersenne—that a creature can draw something from nothing, that accidents can pass from substance to substance, that atoms exist etc., all that being tantamount if not to atheism at least to deism. Mersenne mentions Giordano Bruno (and his English disciple Nicholas Hill), Tommaso Campanella and Jean Bodin in the same list. In 1662 Arnold Verhel, a professor at the University of Franeker, still complains about Gorlaeans.

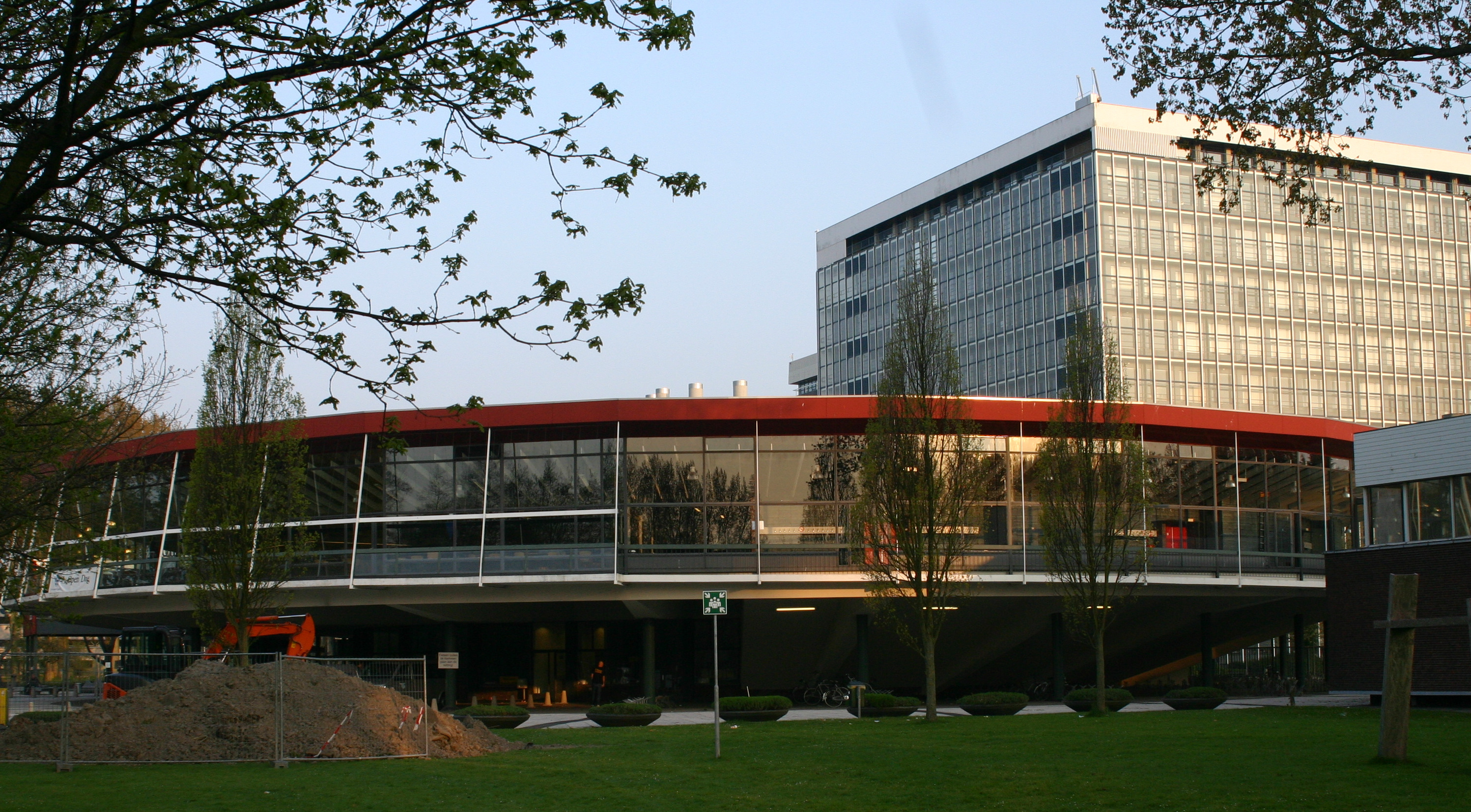
Gorlaeus Building, Leiden University

Gorlaeus Laboratoria, a building of the University of Leiden, bears Van Goorle's name.

== Works ==
- Exercitationes philosophicae, Leiden 1620.
- Idea physicae, Utrecht 1651. (Also digitized by e-rara.ch: doi:10.3931/e-rara-17124)

== Bibliography ==
- Lüthy, Christoph. David Gorlaeus (1591-1612). An enigmatic figure in the history of philosophy and science, Amsterdam, Amsterdam University Press, 2012.
