= Rubens Vase =

Late anique carved stone vase

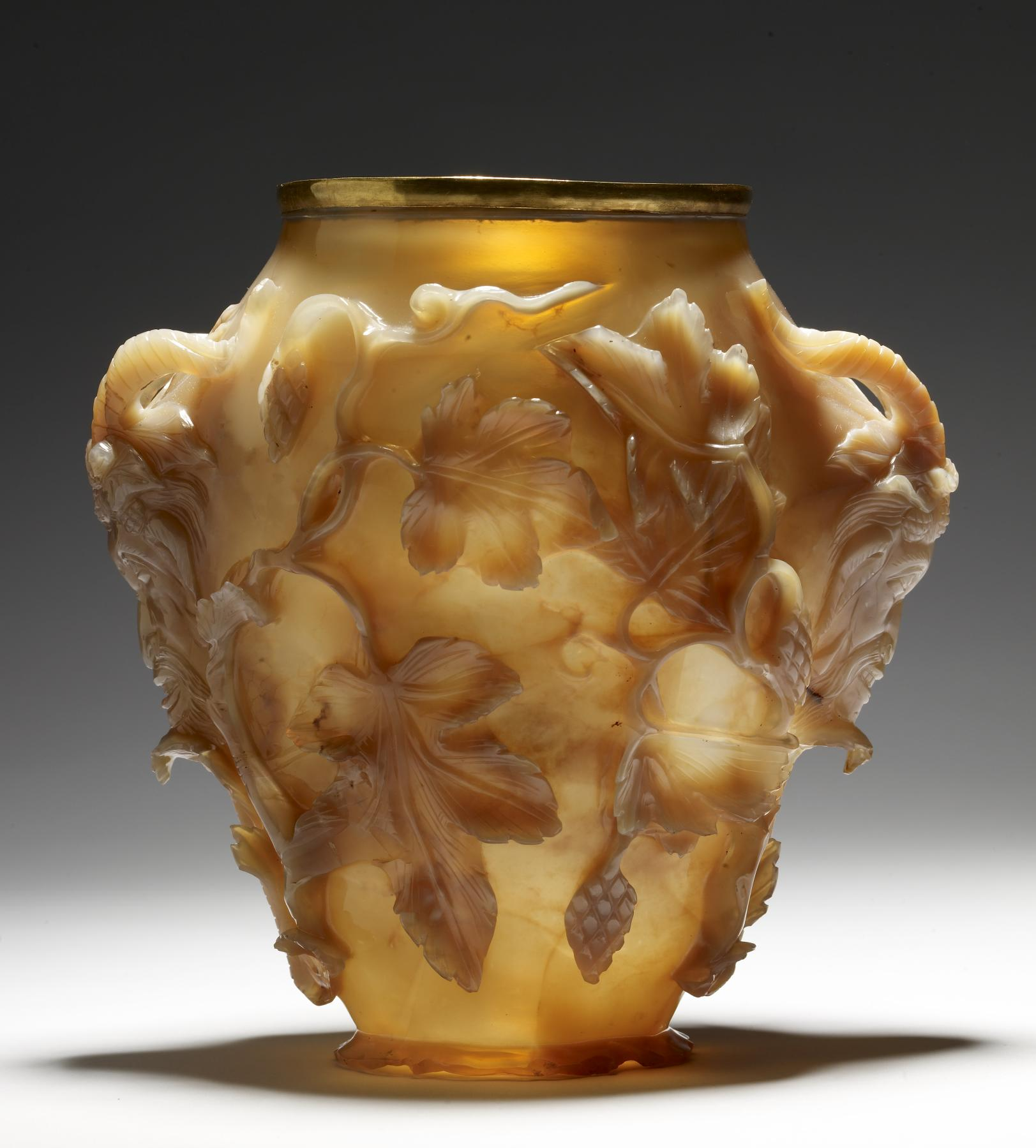
The Rubens Vase, Walters Art Museum

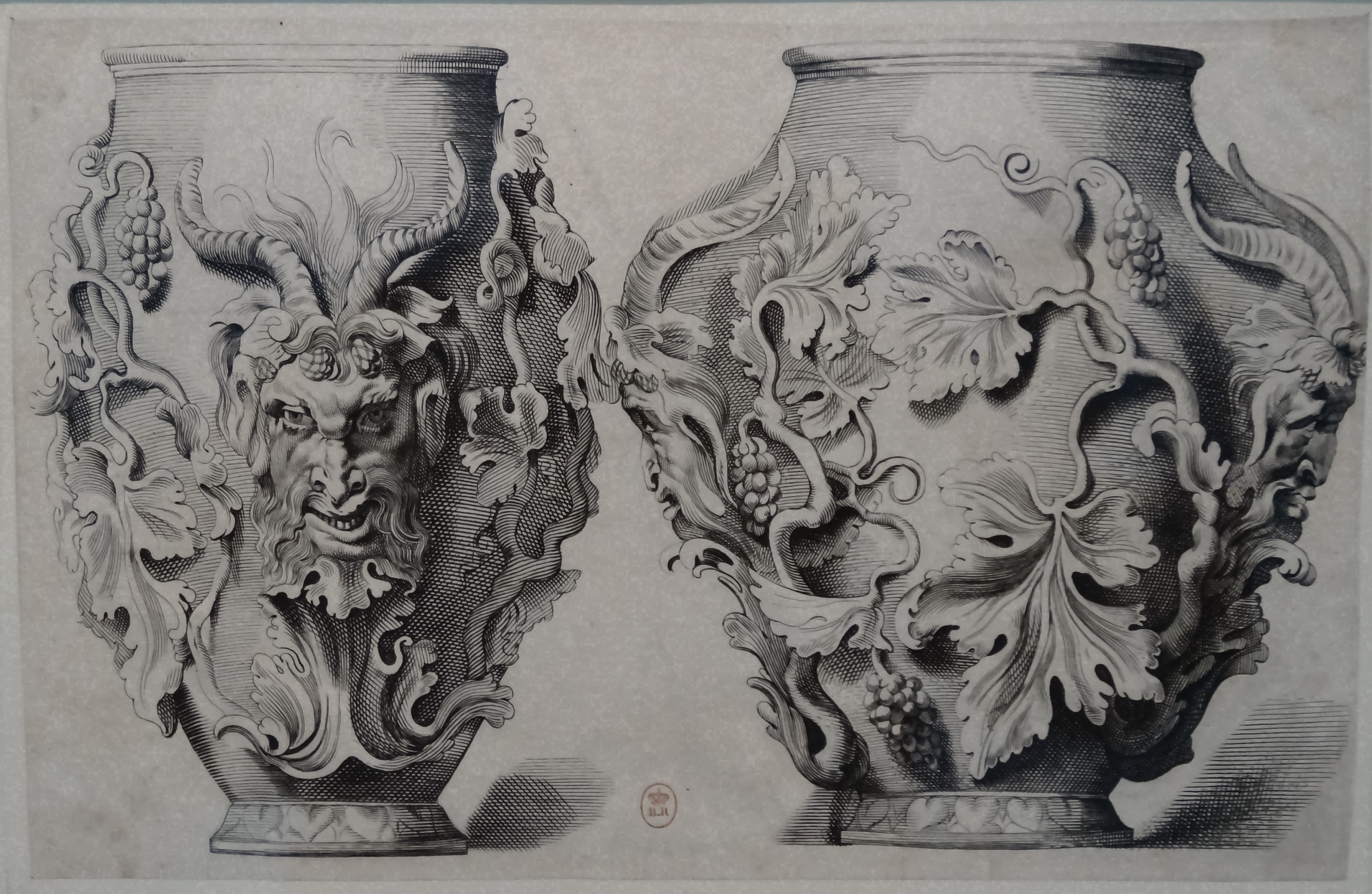
A 1640-1652 print after Rubens' drawing

The Rubens Vase is a Late Antique or early Byzantine hardstone carving of a single piece of agate in the form of a vase, named after a later owner, Peter Paul Rubens, (from 1619 to 1626), who in Flanders made a pen drawing of it, which is now held in the Hermitage Museum. The handles are decorated with the head of Pan on each side with acanthus leaves beneath each head, curled up. It is believed to have been commissioned by a Byzantine emperor, perhaps around 400 AD, and made in Constantinople. That it appeared in western Europe (France specifically) after the Sack of Constantinople by the Fourth Crusade, may indicate that it was the result of plunder. After passing through the collections of the Dukes of Anjou, Charles V, Peter Paul Rubens, and the Mughal Emperor Jahangir, it was eventually purchased by Henry Walters.

It has an oval shape, and is 7 5/16 inches high, 7 5/16 wide, and 4 3/4 deep (18.6 × 18.5 × 12 cm).

== Provenance ==
Foire Saint Germain Sale, Paris, 1619; Peter Paul Rubens, Antwerp, 1619, by purchase; Daniel Fourment, Antwerp, ca. 1626-1628, by purchase; Emperor Jahangir of India [date of acquisition unknown], by consignment; Dutch East India Company, prior to 1635, by confiscation; Holland, 1818; William Beckford, Fonthill Abbey, Wiltshire, 1818, by purchase; Sale, English & Fasana, Bath, November 20, 1845, no. 167; Alexander Hamilton, 10th Duke of Hamilton, London, 1845, by purchase; William A. A. Hamilton, 11th Duke of Hamilton, 1852, by inheritance; William A. L. S. Douglas-Hamilton, 12th Duke of Hamilton, 1863, by inheritance; Sale, Christie's, London, June 17, 1882, no. 487; Samson Wertheimer, London, 1882, by purchase; Sale, Christie's, London, March 15, 1892; Alfred Morrison, London, 1892, by purchase; Sale, Christie's, London, June 12, 1899; Sir Francis Cook, Richmond, 1899, by purchase; Wyndham F. Cook, London, 1901, by inheritance; Humphrey W. Cook, London, 1905, by inheritance; Sale, London, Christie's, July 14, 1925, no. 90; Henry Walters, New York, 1925, by purchase; Sadie Jones (Mrs. Henry Walters), New York, 1931, by inheritance; Sale, Parke-Bernet, New York, May 2, 1941, no. 1316; Walters Art Museum, 1941, by purchase.

— The website of The Walters Art Museum
