= Pietra dura =

Decorative stone inlays

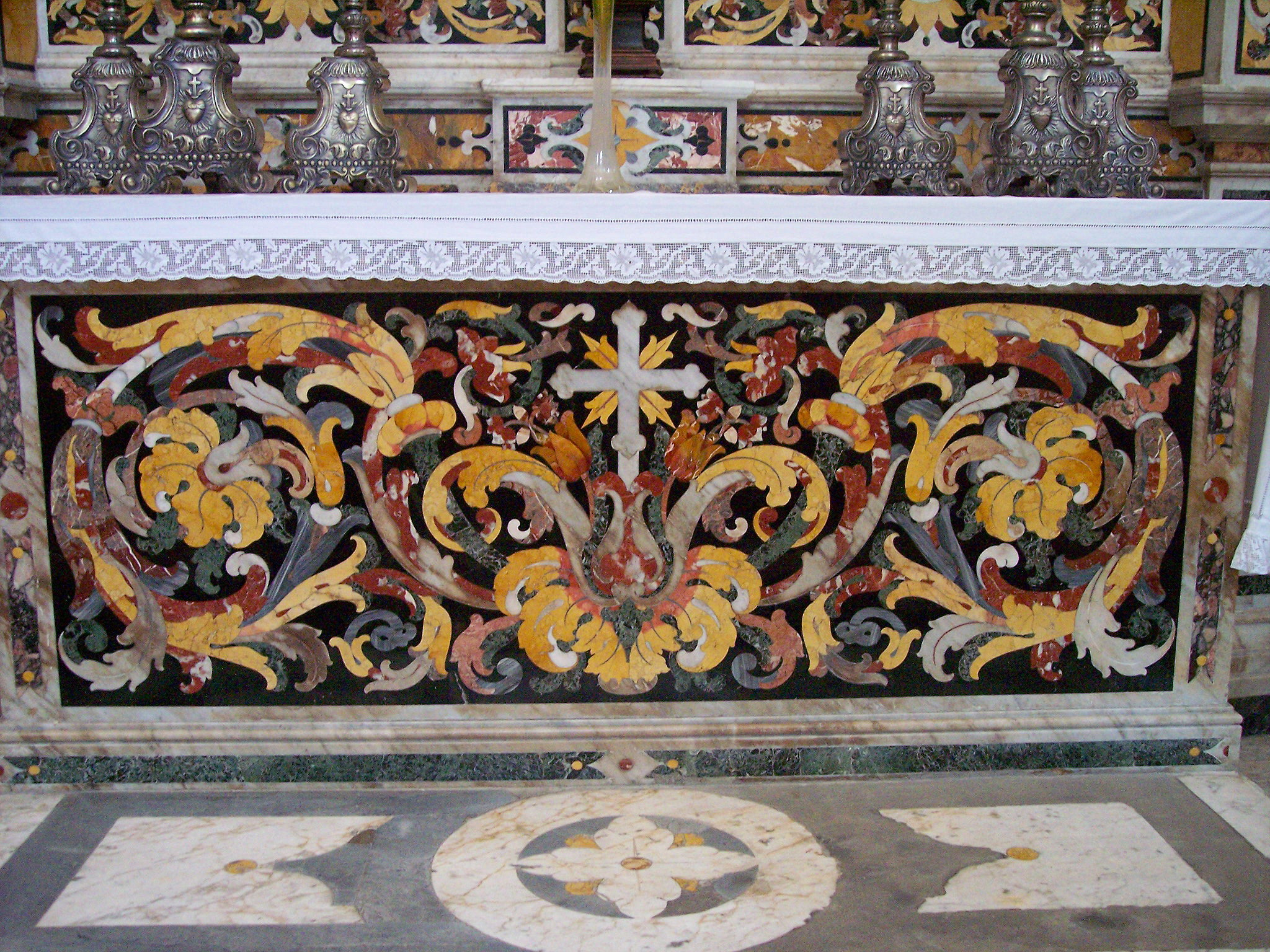
Altar frontal of Italian opera di commessi, Dubrovnik Cathedral

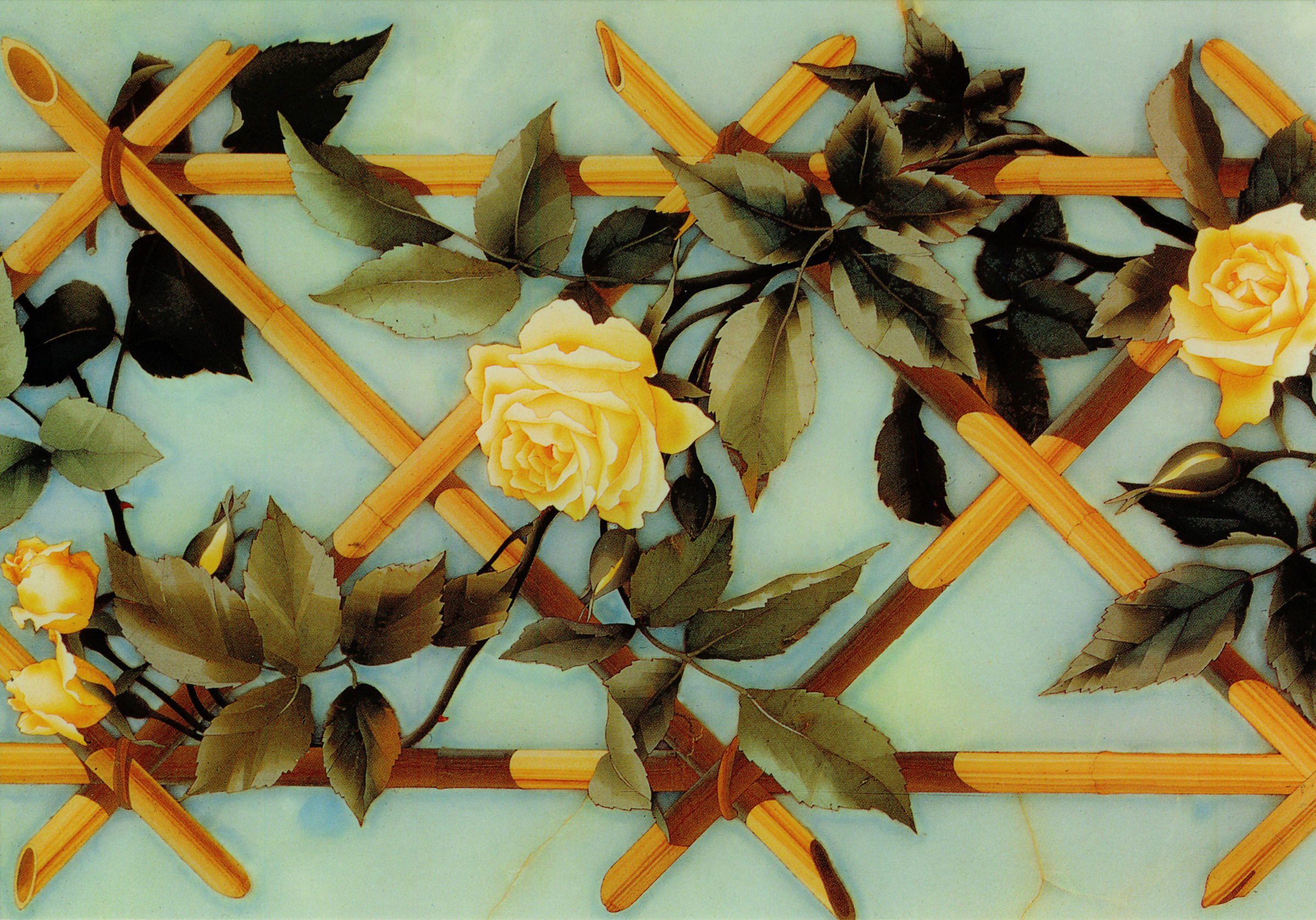
Detail of design with roses over crossed canes, 1882

Pietra dura (Italian: [ˈpjɛːtra ˈduːra]), pietre dure ([ˈpjɛːtre ˈduːre]) or intarsia lapidary (see below), called parchin kari or parchinkari (Persian: پرچین کاری) in the Indian subcontinent, is a term for the inlay technique of using cut and fitted, highly polished colored stones to create images. It is considered a decorative art. The stonework, after the work is assembled loosely, is glued stone-by-stone to a substrate after having previously been "sliced and cut in different shape sections, and then assembled together so precisely that the contact between each section was practically invisible". Stability was achieved by grooving the undersides of the stones so that they interlocked, rather like a jigsaw puzzle, with everything held tautly in place by an encircling 'frame'. Many different colored stones, particularly marbles, were used, along with semiprecious, and even precious stones. It first appeared in Rome in the 16th century, reaching its full maturity in Florence. Pietra dura items are generally crafted on green, white or black marble base stones. Typically, the resulting panel is completely flat, but some examples where the image is in low relief were made, taking the work more into the area of hardstone carving.

== Related arts and terms ==
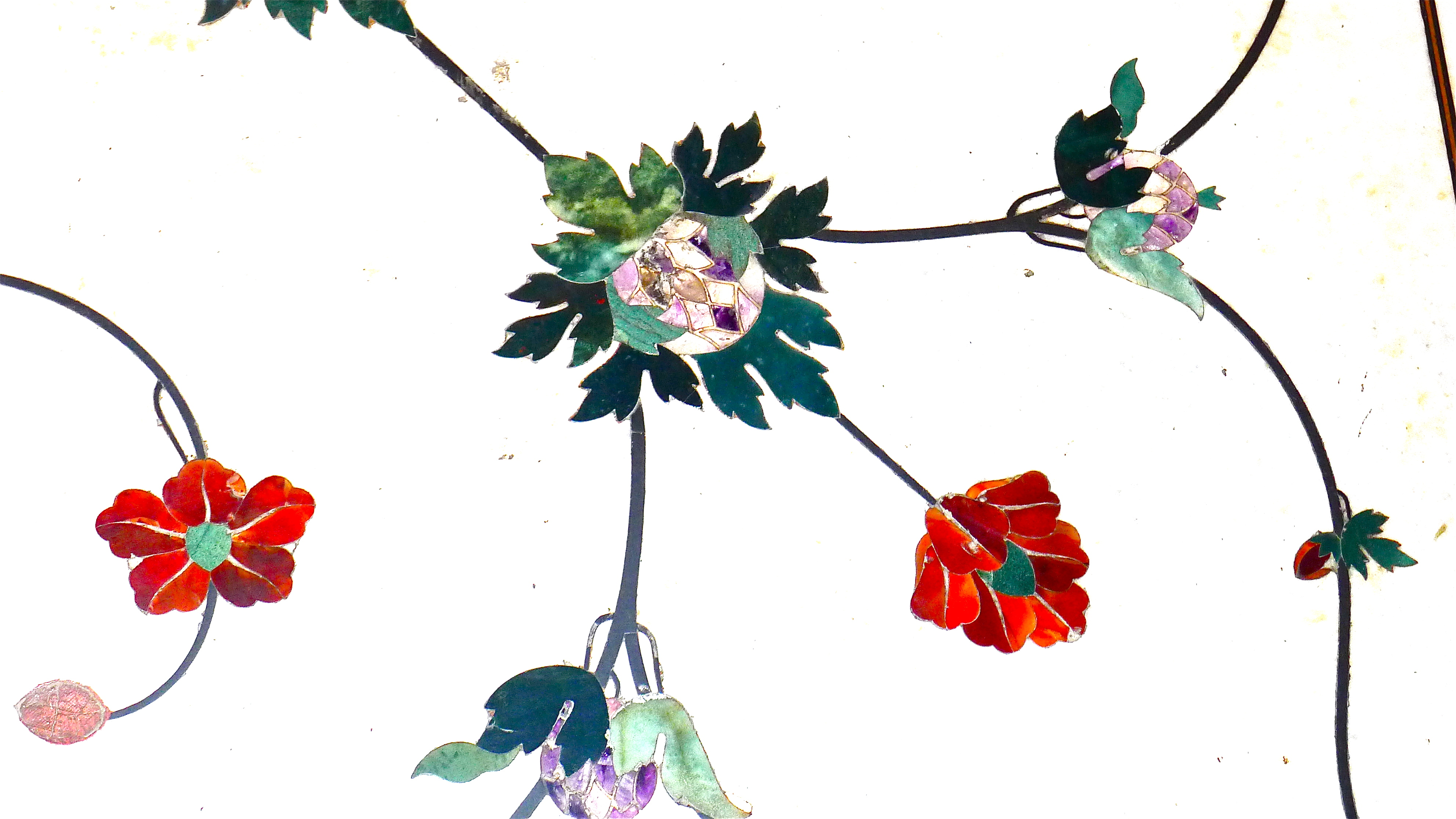
Pietra dura detail with semiprecious stones inlaid into white marble at the Tomb of Jahangir in Lahore

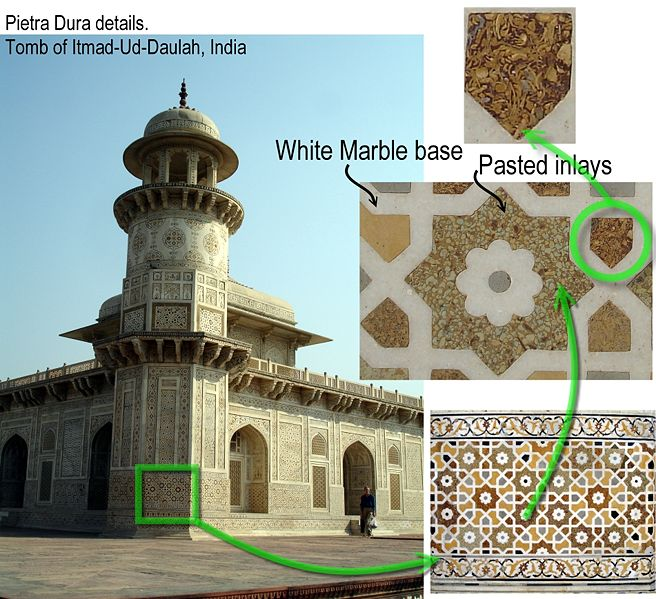
Itmad-Ud-Daulah's Tomb in Agra is decorated with arabesques and geometric patterns.

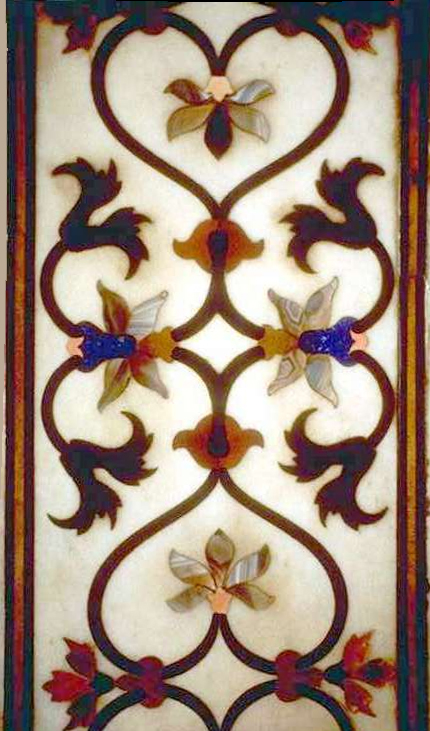
Floral 'parchin kari' work in the Taj Mahal, incorporating precious and semi-precious stone

Pietre dure is an Italian plural meaning "hard rocks" or hardstones; the singular pietra dura is also encountered in Italian. In Italian, but not in English, the term embraces all gem engraving and hardstone carving, which is the artistic carving of three-dimensional objects in semi-precious stone, normally from a single piece, for example in Chinese jade. The traditional convention in English has been to use the singular pietra dura just to denote multi-colored inlay work. However, in recent years there has been a trend to use "pietre dure" as a term for the same thing, but not for all of the techniques it covers, in Italian. But the title of a 2008 exhibition at the Metropolitan Museum of Art, New York, Art of the Royal Court: Treasures in Pietre Dure from the Palaces of Europe, used the full Italian sense of the term, probably because they thought that it had greater brand recognition. The material on the website speaks of objects such as a vase in lapis lazuli as being examples of "hardstone carving (pietre dure)". The Victoria & Albert Museum in London uses both versions on its website, but uses "pietra dura" ("A method of inlaying coloured marbles or semi-precious stones into a stone base, often in geometric or flower patterns....") in its "Glossary", which was evidently not consulted by the author of another page, where the reader is told: "Pietre dure (from the Italian 'hard stone') is made from finely sliced coloured stones, precisely matched, to create a pictorial scene or regular design". The English term "Florentine mosaic" is sometimes also encountered, probably developed by the tourist industry. Giovanni Montelatici (1864–1930) was an Italian Florentine artist whose brilliant work has been distributed across the world by tourists and collectors.

It is distinct from mosaic in that the component stones are mostly much larger and cut to a shape suiting their place in the image, not all of roughly equal size and shape as in mosaic. In pietra dura, the stones are not cemented together with grout, and works in pietra dura are often portable. Nor should it be confused with micromosaics, a form of mosaic using very small tesserae of the same size to create images rather than decorative patterns, for Byzantine icons, and later for panels for setting into furniture and the like.

For fixed inlay work on walls, ceilings, and pavements that do not meet the definition of mosaic, the better terms are intarsia or, in some specific applications, Cosmatesque. Similarly, for works that use larger pieces of stone or tile, opus sectile may be used. Pietra dura is essentially stone marquetry. As a high expression of lapidary art, it is closely related to the art of jewellery. It can also be considered a branch of sculpture because three-dimensionality can be achieved, as with bas relief.

== History ==
Pietra dura developed from the ancient Roman opus sectile, which at least in terms of surviving examples, was architectural, used on floors and walls, with both geometric and figurative designs. In the Middle Ages cosmatesque floors and small columns, etc. on tombs and altars continued to use inlays of different colours in geometric patterns. Byzantine art continued with inlaid floors, but also produced some small religious figures in hardstone inlays, for example in the Pala d'Oro in San Marco, Venice (though this mainly uses enamel). In the Italian Renaissance this technique again was used for images. The Florentines, who most fully developed the form, however, regarded it as 'painting in stone'.

As it developed in Florence, the technique was initially called "opere di commessi" (approximately, "Fitted together works"). Medici Grand Duke Ferdinando I of Tuscany founded the Galleria di Lavori in 1588, now the Opificio delle pietre dure, for the purpose of developing this and other decorative forms.

A multitude of varied objects were created. Table tops were particularly prized, and these tend to be the largest specimens. Smaller items in the form of medallions, cameos, wall plaques, panels inserted into doors or onto cabinets, bowls, jardinieres, garden ornaments, fountains, benches, etc. are all found. A popular form was to copy an existing painting, often of a human figure, as illustrated by the image of Pope Clement VIII, above. Examples are found in many museums. The medium was transported to other European centers of court art and remained popular into the 19th century. In particular, Naples became a noted center of the craft. By the 20th century, the medium was in decline, in part by the assault of modernism, and the craft had been reduced to mainly restoration work. In recent decades, however, the form has been revived, and receives state-funded sponsorship. Modern examples range from tourist-oriented souvenirs, including reproductions of 19th century style religious subjects (especially in Florence and Naples), to works copying or based on older designs used for luxurious decorative contexts, to works in a contemporary artistic idiom.

== Parchin kari ==
By the early part of the 17th century, smaller objects produced by the Opificio were widely diffused throughout Europe, and as far east to the court of the Mughals in India, where the form was imitated and reinterpreted in a native style; its most sumptuous expression is found in the Taj Mahal. In Mughal India, pietra dura was known as parchin kari, literally 'inlay' or 'driven-in' work.

Due to the Taj Mahal being one of the major tourist attractions, there is a flourishing industry of pietra dura artifacts in Agra.

== Gallery ==
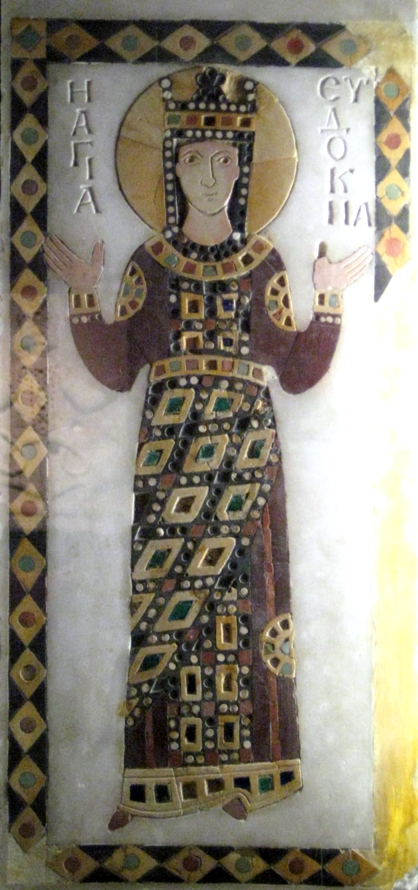
10th century Byzantine panel with Aelia Eudocia

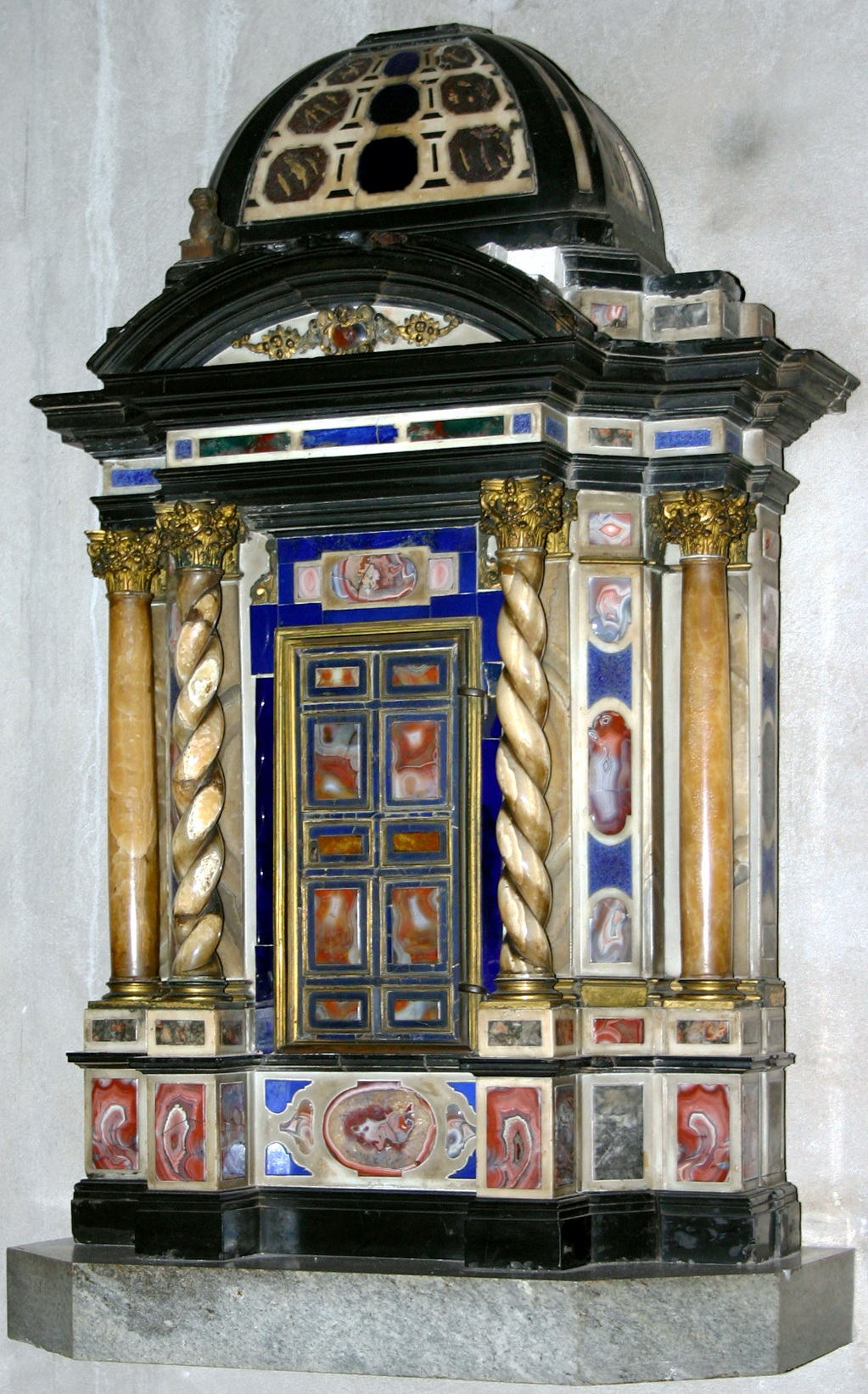
Altar in Milan, concentrating on the natural patterns of the stone

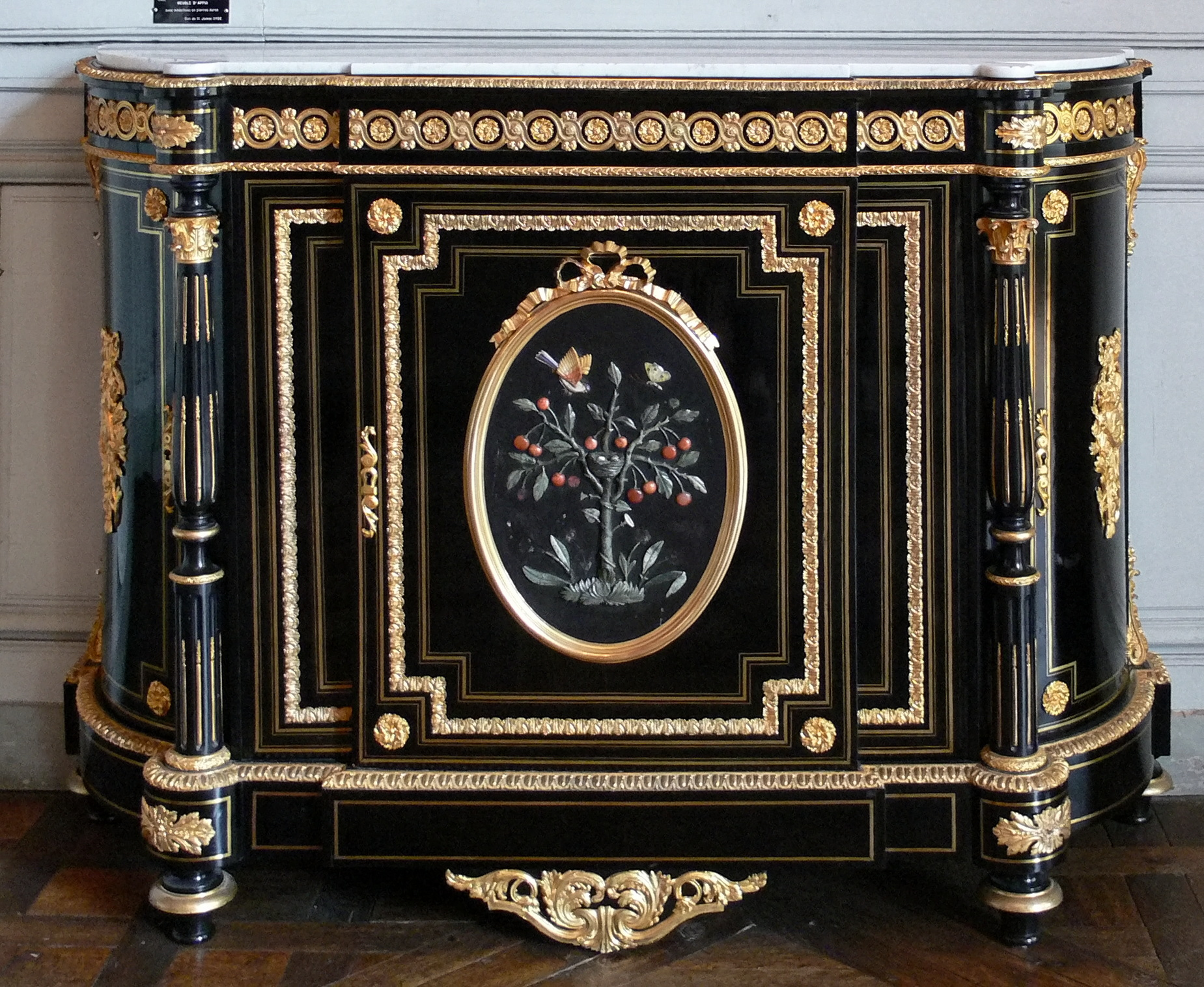
19th century French sideboard with relief pietra dura panel

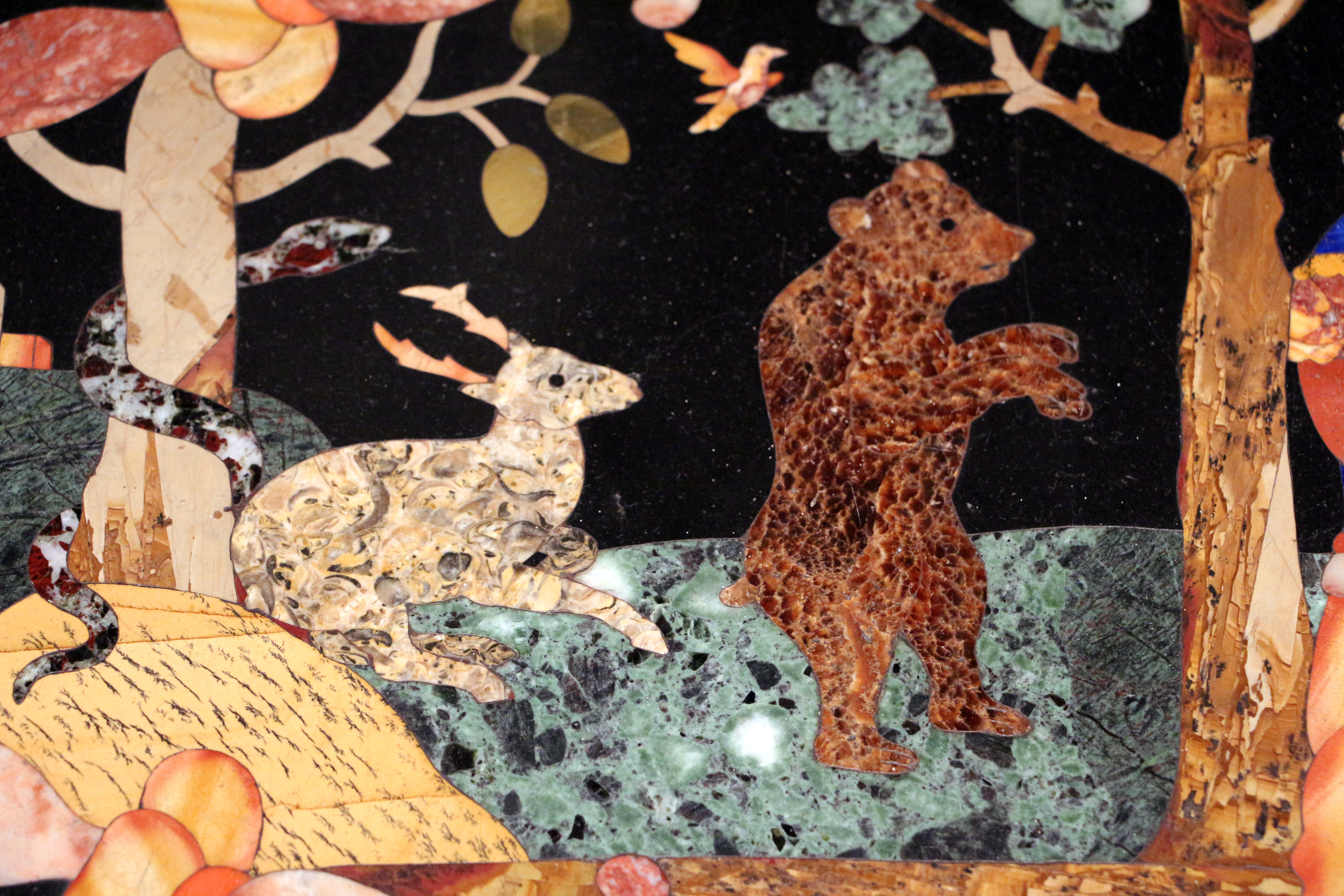
Detail of table top in Venice, by the Grand-ducal workshop in Florence; Orpheus charms the animals.

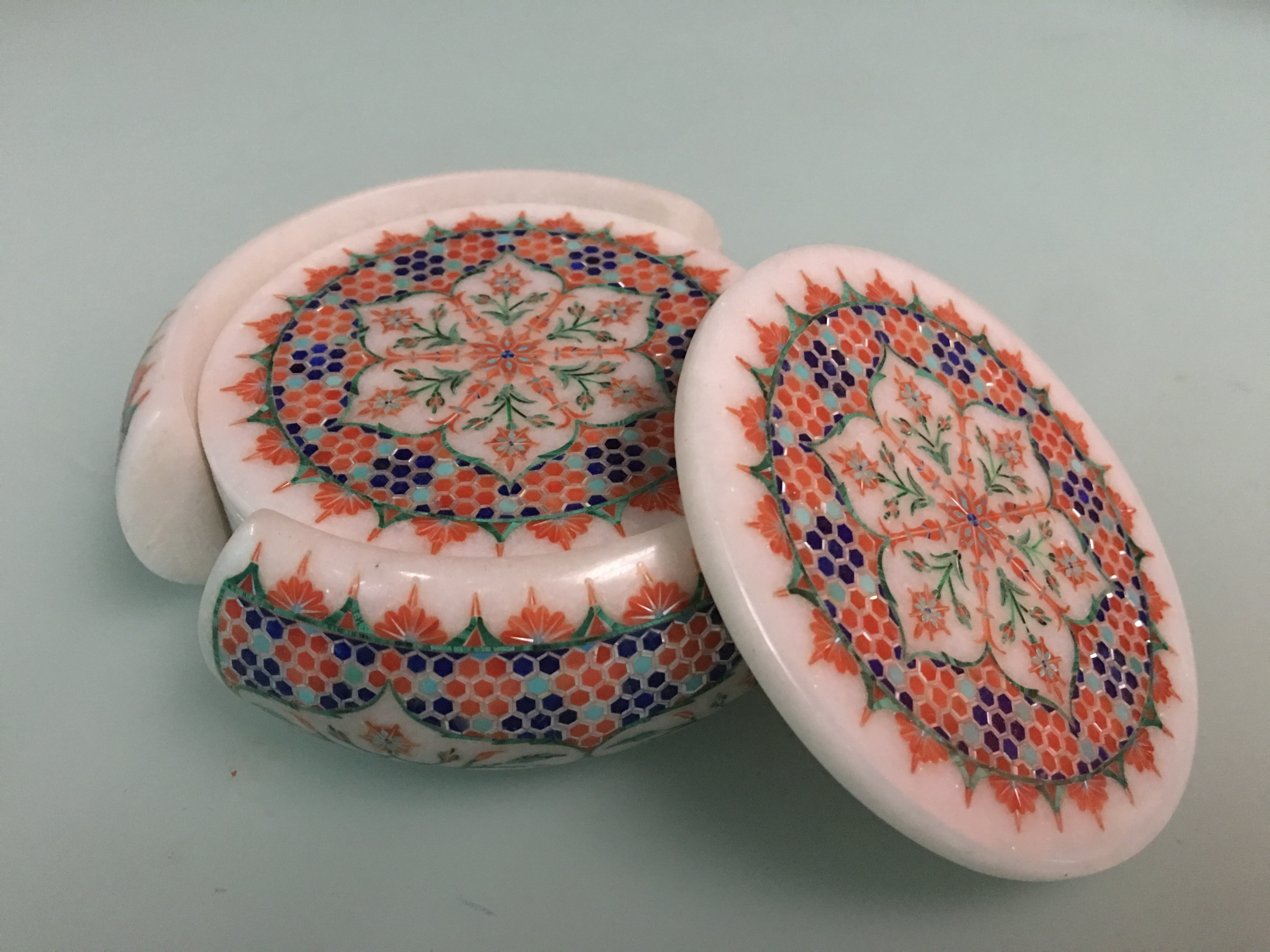
Very fine contemporary example of parchinkari from Agra, India. 19,444 semi-precious stones were individually cut and inlaid in white marble to create this item.

Florentine pietra dura panel created by Giovanni Montelatici in the late 1800s

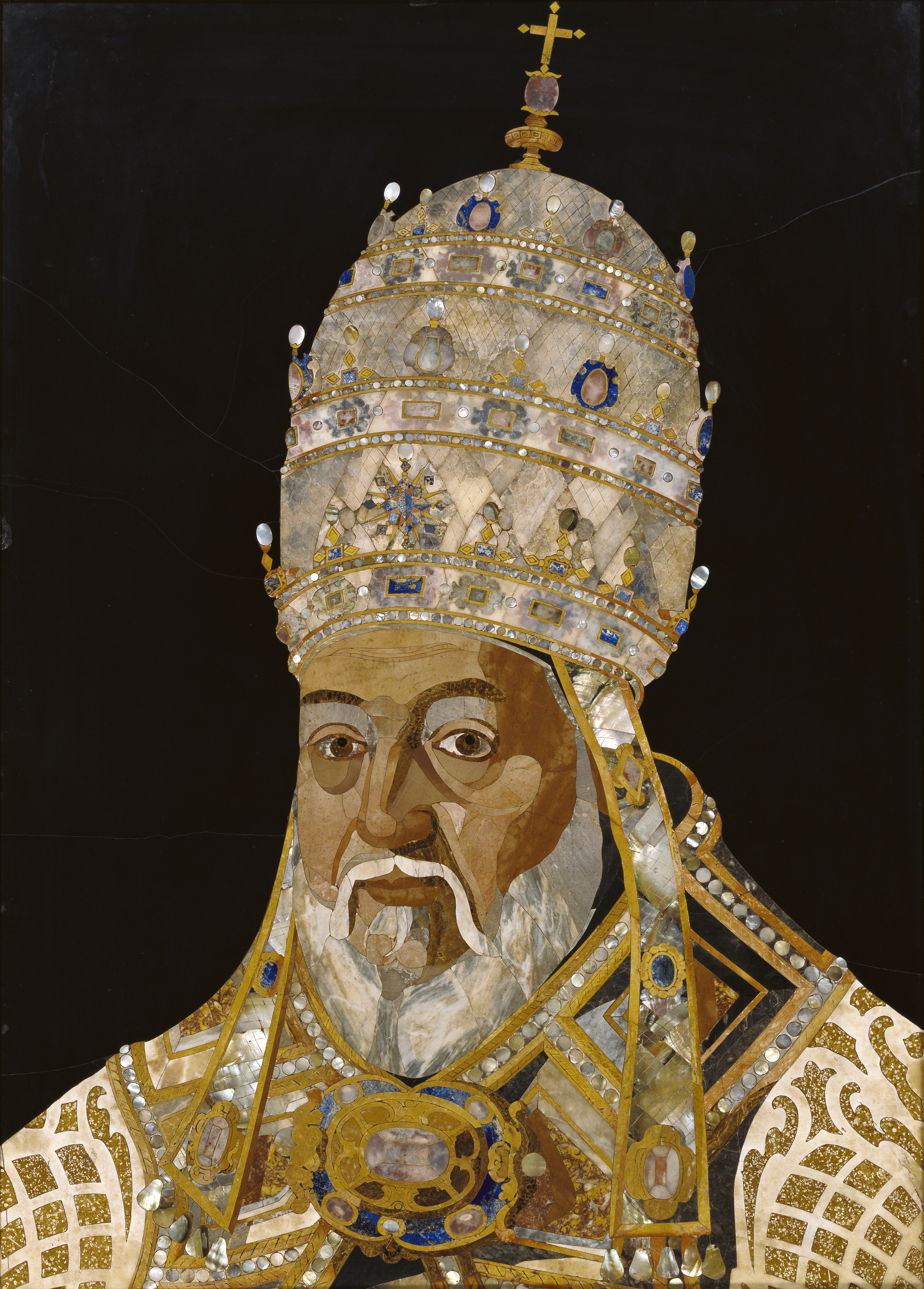
Pope Clement VIII in pietra dura designed by Jacopo Ligozzi, executed by Romolo di Francesco Ferrucci del Tadda
