= Hardstone =

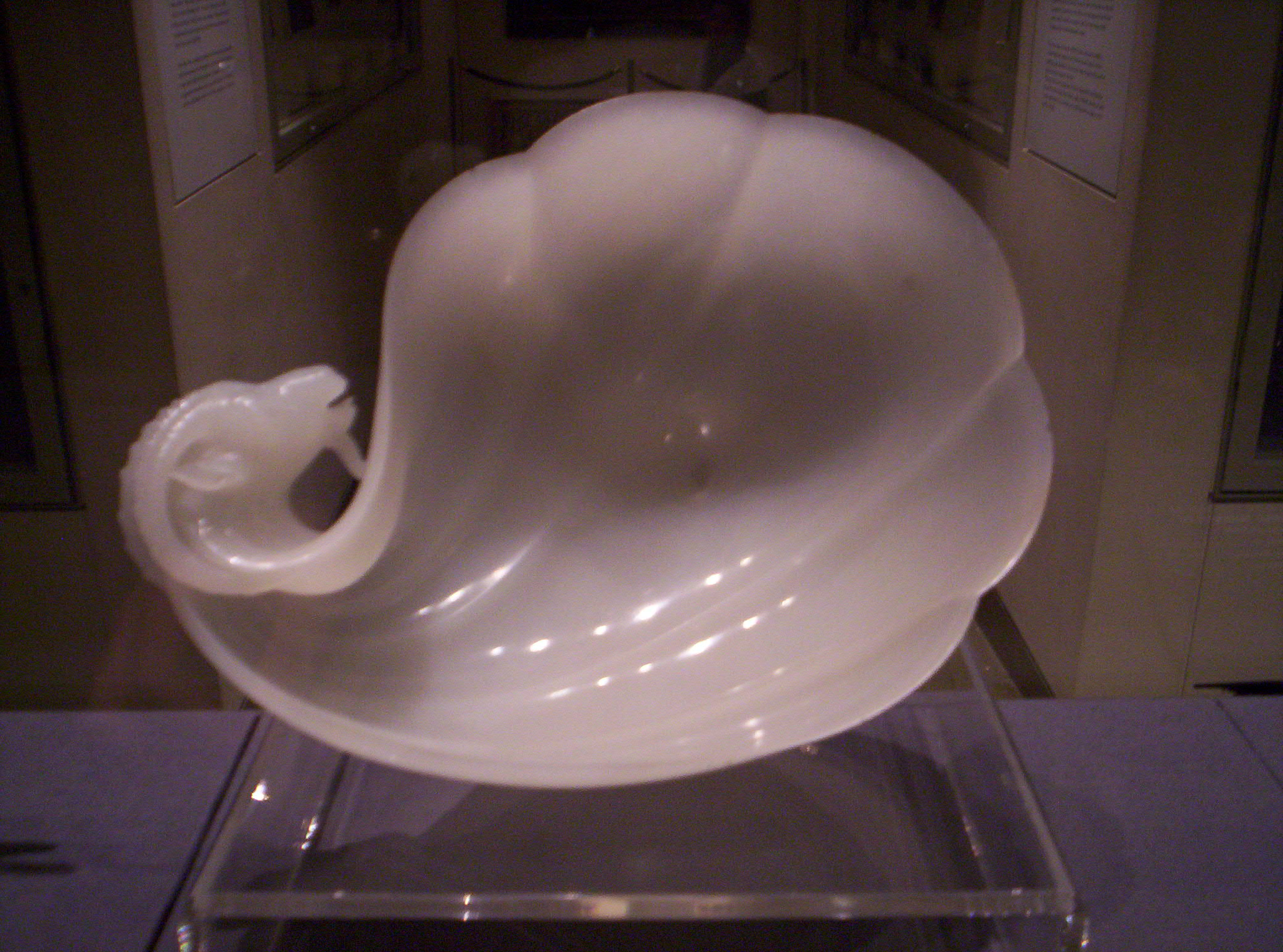
Jade is a classic hardstone, used here for the wine cup of the Mughal Emperor Shah Jahan.

Hardstone is a non-scientific term, mostly encountered in the decorative arts or archaeology, that has a similar meaning to semi-precious stones, or gemstones. Very hard building stones, such as granite, are not included in the term in this sense, but only stones which are fairly hard and regarded as attractive – ones which could be used in jewellery. Hardstone carving is the three-dimensional carving for artistic purposes of semi-precious stones such as jade, agate, onyx, rock crystal, sard or carnelian, and a general term for an object made in this way. Two-dimensional inlay techniques for floors, furniture and walls include pietre dure, opus sectile (Ancient Roman), and medieval Cosmatesque work – these typically inlay hardstone pieces into a background of marble or some other building stone.

The definition of "hardstone" is not very rigid, but excludes "soft" stones such as soapstone (steatite) and minerals such as alabaster, both widely used for carving. Hard organic minerals such as amber and jet are included, as well as the mineraloid obsidian. Geologically speaking, most of the gemstones carved in the West are varieties of quartz, including chalcedony, agate, amethyst, sard, onyx, carnelian, heliotrope, jasper and quartz in its uncoloured form, known as rock crystal. On the Mohs scale of mineral hardness, quartz rates no higher than a 7, less for types with impurities. Stones typically used for buildings and large sculpture are not often used for small objects such as vessels, although this does occur.

The term is derived from a literal translation of the Italian plural pietre dure, 'hard stones', which in Italian covers all hardstone carving. The semi-anglicized singular pietra dura is used in English for multi-coloured stone inlay work, in fact using marbles as much as semi-precious stones, which was a Florentine speciality from the Renaissance onwards. Pietre dure is sometimes used for Italian or European vessels and small sculptures of the same period.
