= Hardstone carving =

Artistic carving of semi-precious stones or gems

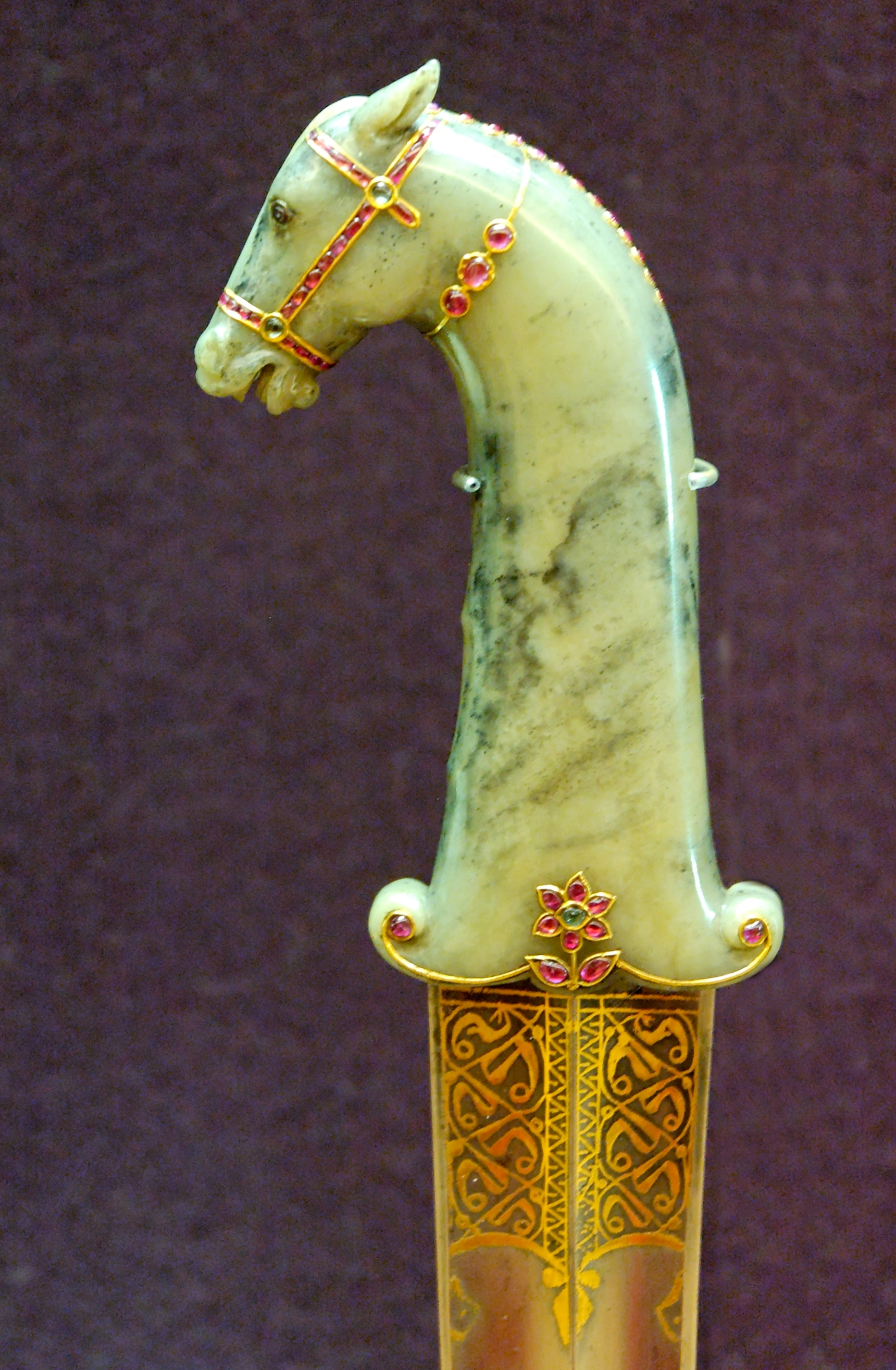
Mughal dagger hilt in jade with gold, rubies, and emeralds.

Hardstone carving, in art history and archaeology, is the artistic carving of semi-precious stones (and sometimes gemstones), such as jade, rock crystal (clear quartz), agate, onyx, jasper, serpentinite, or carnelian, and for objects made in this way. Normally the objects are small, and the category overlaps with both jewellery and sculpture. Hardstone carving is sometimes referred to by the Italian term pietre dure; however, pietra dura (with an "a") is the common term used for stone inlay work, which causes some confusion.

From the Neolithic period until about the 19th century such objects were among the most highly prized in a wide variety of cultures, often attributed special powers or religious significance, but today coverage in non-specialist art history tends to be relegated to a catch-all decorative arts or "minor arts" category. The types of objects carved have included those with ritual or religious purposes, engraved gems as signet rings and other kinds of seal, handles, belt hooks and similar items, vessels and purely decorative objects.

== Scope of the term ==
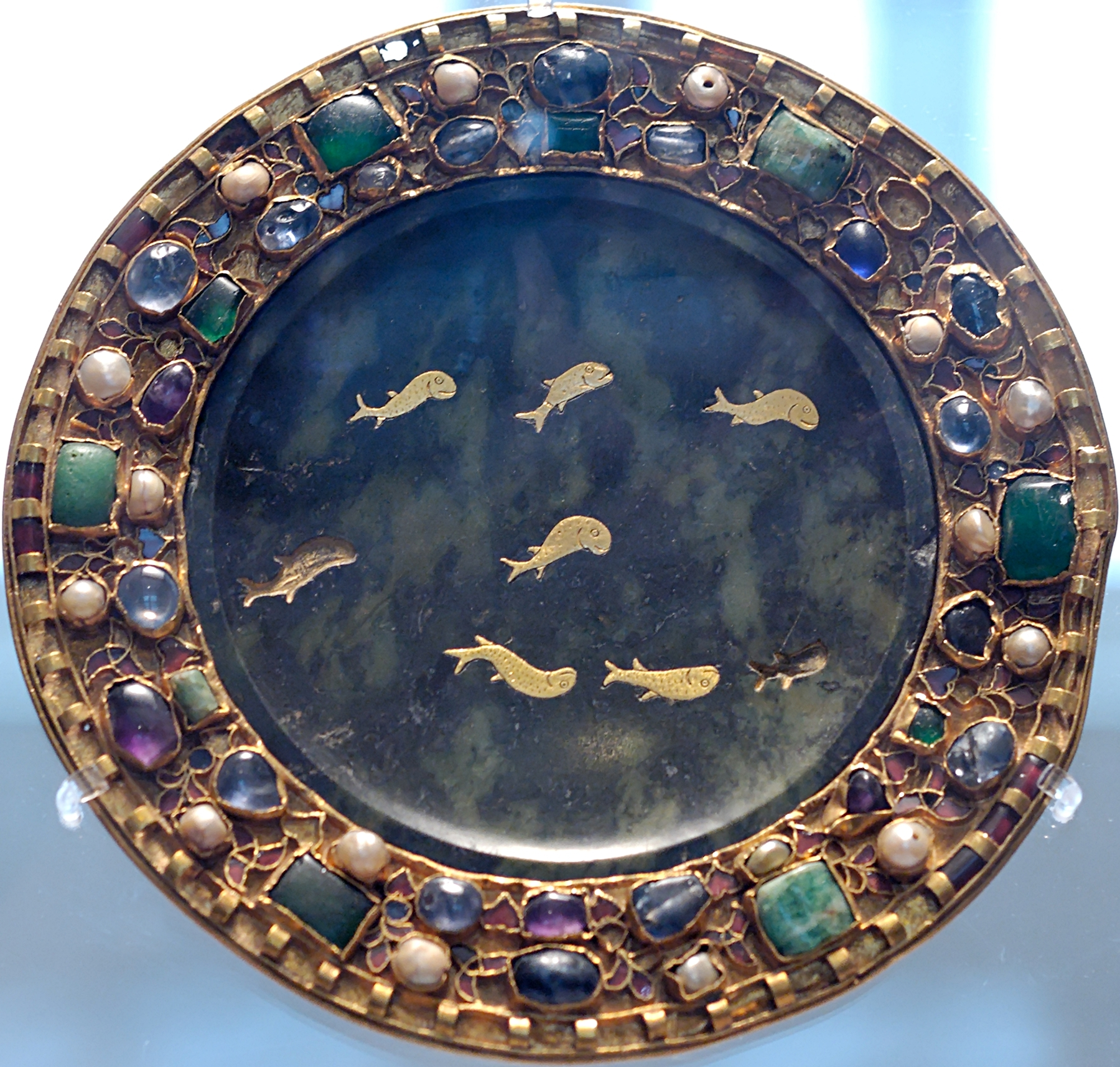
Dish of serpentine with inlaid gold fish, Roman, 1st century BCE or CE, with 9th-century mounts dated to the reign of Holy Roman Emperor Charles the Bald

Hardstone carving falls under the general category of glyptic art, which covers small carvings and sculpture in all categories of stone. The definition in this context of "hardstone" is unscientific and not very rigid, but excludes "soft" stones such as soapstone (steatite) and minerals such as alabaster, both widely used for carving, as well as typical stones for building and monumental sculpture, such as marble and other types of limestone, and sandstone. These are typically not capable of a fine finish in very small carvings, and would wear in prolonged use. In other contexts, such as architecture, "hard stone" and "soft stone" have different meanings, referring to actual measured hardness using the Mohs scale of mineral hardness and other measures. Some rocks used in architecture and monumental sculpture, such as granite, are at least as hard as the gemstones, and others such as malachite are relatively soft but counted as hardstones because of their rarity and fine colour.

Essentially, any stone that is often used in jewellery is likely to count as a hardstone. Hard organic minerals such as amber and jet are included, as well as the mineraloid obsidian. Hardstones normally have to be drilled rather than worked with edged tools to achieve a fine finish. Geologically speaking, most of the gemstones traditionally carved in the West are varieties of quartz, including: chalcedony, agate, amethyst, sard, onyx, carnelian, heliotrope, jasper, and quartz in its uncoloured and transparent form, known as rock crystal. The various materials called jade have been dominant in East Asian and Mesoamerican carving. Stones typically used for buildings and large sculpture are not often used for small objects such as vessels, although this does occur. For example, in the Uruk period of Sumerian culture (4th millennium BCE) heavy vases, cups and ewers of sandstone and limestone have been found, but were not for common use, as the people of Uruk had well-developed pottery.

== History ==
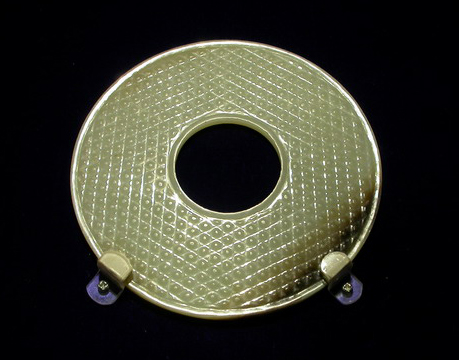
Han dynasty jade bi

=== Asia and the Islamic world ===
The art is very ancient, going back to the Indus Valley civilization and beyond, and major traditions include cylinder seals and other small carvings in the Ancient Near East, which were also made in softer stones. Inlays of semi-precious stones were often used for decoration or highlights in sculptures of other materials, for example statues often had eyes inlaid with white shell and blue lapis lazuli or another stone.

Chinese jade carving begins with the carving of ritual objects, including blades for ji and dagger-axes clearly never intended for use, and the "Six Ritual Jades" including the bi and cong, which according to much later literature represented heaven and earth respectively. These are found from the Neolithic Liangzhu culture (3400-2250 BCE) onwards, and blades from the 2nd millennium BCE Shang dynasty on. Traditional Chinese culture attaches strong powers to jade; the jade burial suits in which aristocrats of the Han dynasty (206 BCE–220 CE) were buried were intended to preserve the body from decay.

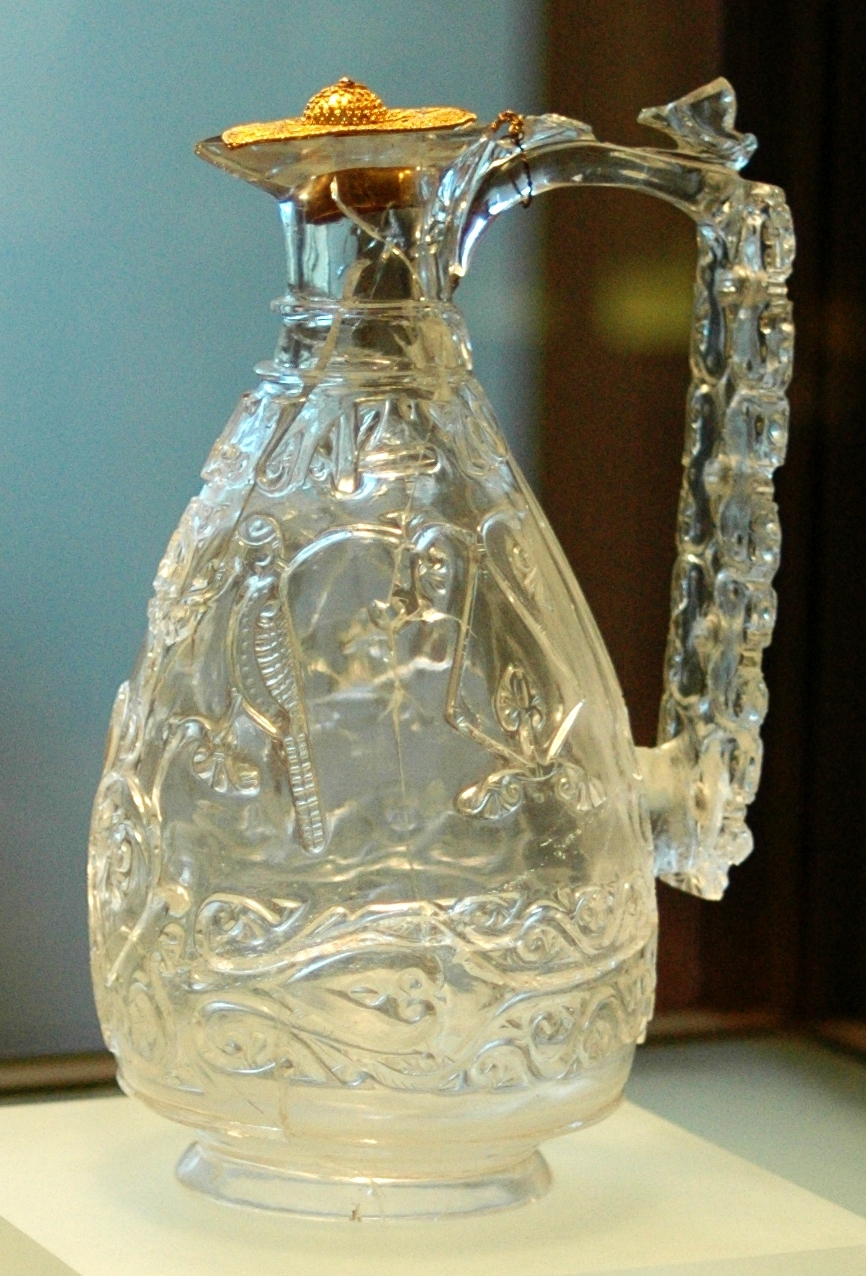
Fatimid carved rock crystal ewer, c. 1000, with 11th-century Italian lid.

The Chinese and other cultures often attributed specific properties for detecting and neutralizing poison to gemstones, a belief still alive in the European Renaissance, as shown by the works of Georgius Agricola, the "father of mineralogy". The English word "jade" derives (via the Spanish piedra de ijada) from the Aztec belief that the mineral cured ailments of the kidneys and sides. The Han period also saw the beginning of the tradition of fine decorative jade carving which has lasted until modern times, though the fine carving of other hardstones did not develop until the 17th century, and then appears to have been produced in different workshops and styles from those for jade. In general whiteish nephrite jade was the most highly regarded in China until about 1800, when the deeper and brighter green of the best jadeite became more highly favoured. There are related Asian traditions of Korean jade carving, in Southeast Asia and, to a much lesser extent, Japan.

Smallish Sassanian carvings are known, mostly for seals or jewellery; the central medallion of the "Cup of Chosroes" (gallery) is one of the largest. Egyptian carving of rock crystal into vessels appears in the late 10th century, and virtually disappears after about 1040. In 1062 the Cairo palace of the Fatimid Caliphate was looted by his mercenaries, and the examples found in European treasuries, like the one illustrated, may have been acquired as the booty was dispersed. The rock crystal used in Egypt was apparently traded from East Africa.

Until recently it was thought that jade carving was introduced to the central Asian Islamic world in the Timurid period, but it is becoming clearer that archers' thumb rings, knife hilts, and various other objects had been carved for centuries, even millennia before, though in limited numbers. Islamic jades and other carvings reached a particular peak in the Mughal Empire, where apart from portable carvings inlaid panels of carved stones were included in buildings such as the Taj Mahal. The great wealth of the Mughal court allowed precious stones like rubies and emeralds to be inset freely in objects. The court workshops of the Ottoman Empire also produced lavish and elaborate objects, in similar styles but without reaching the artistic peaks of Mughal carving.

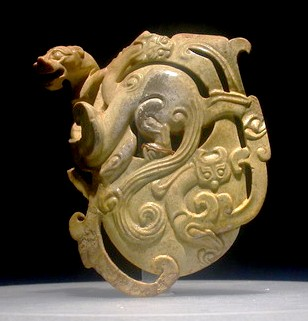
Chinese jade ornament, Western Han dynasty

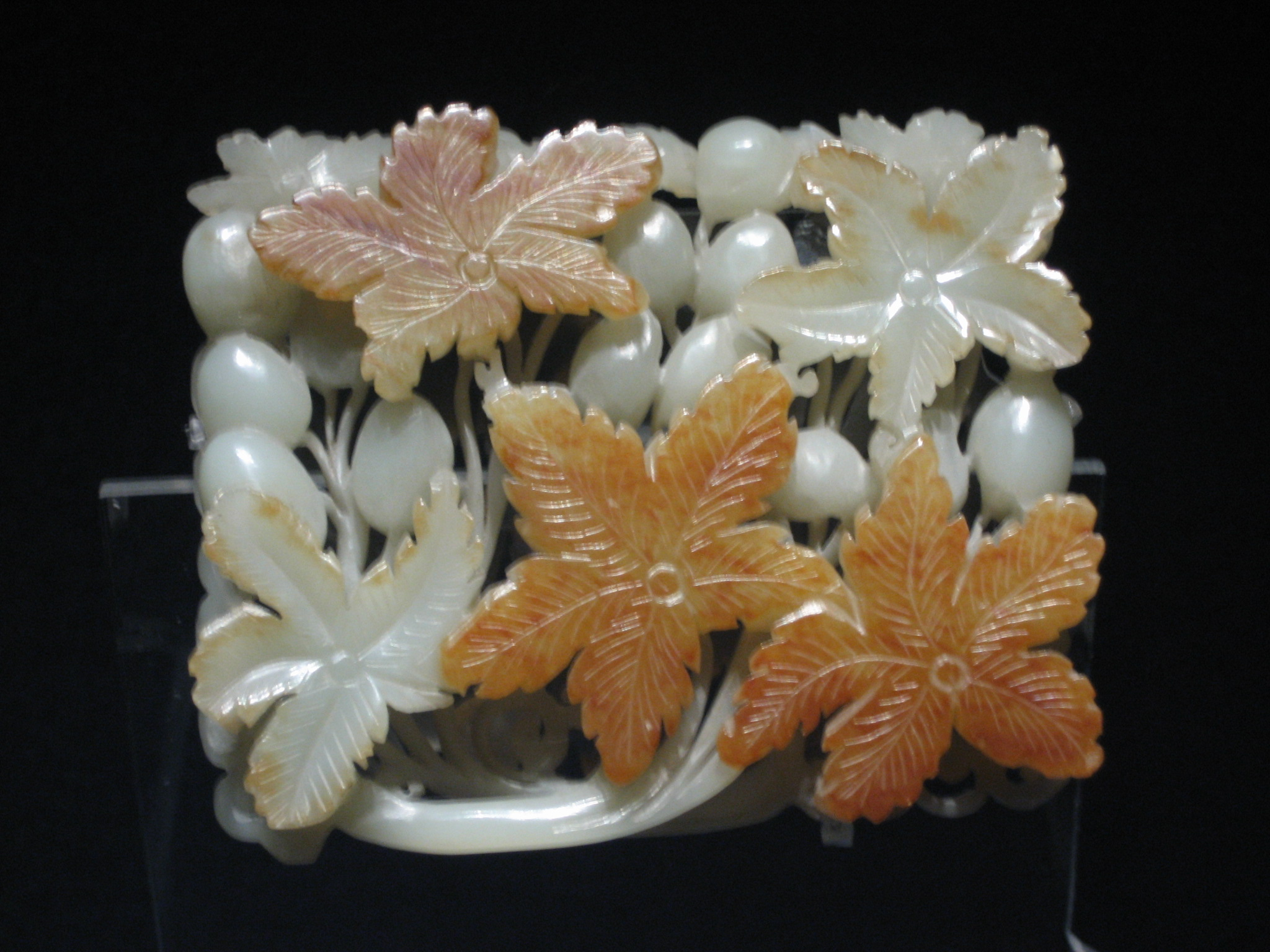
Chinese jade hair ornament, 1115–1234

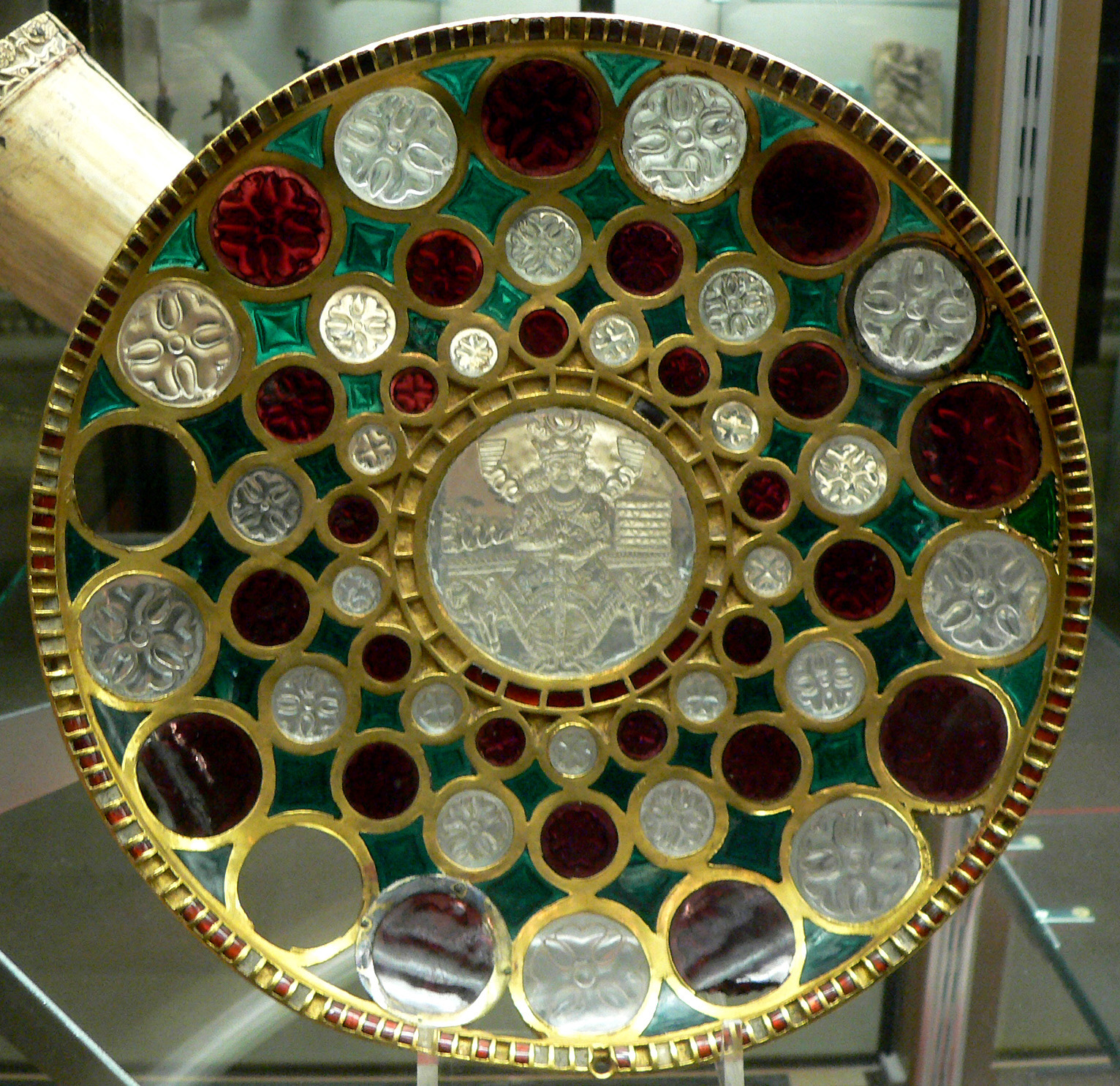
"Cup of Chosroes", from Sassanian Persia. Rock crystal, glass, and other stones

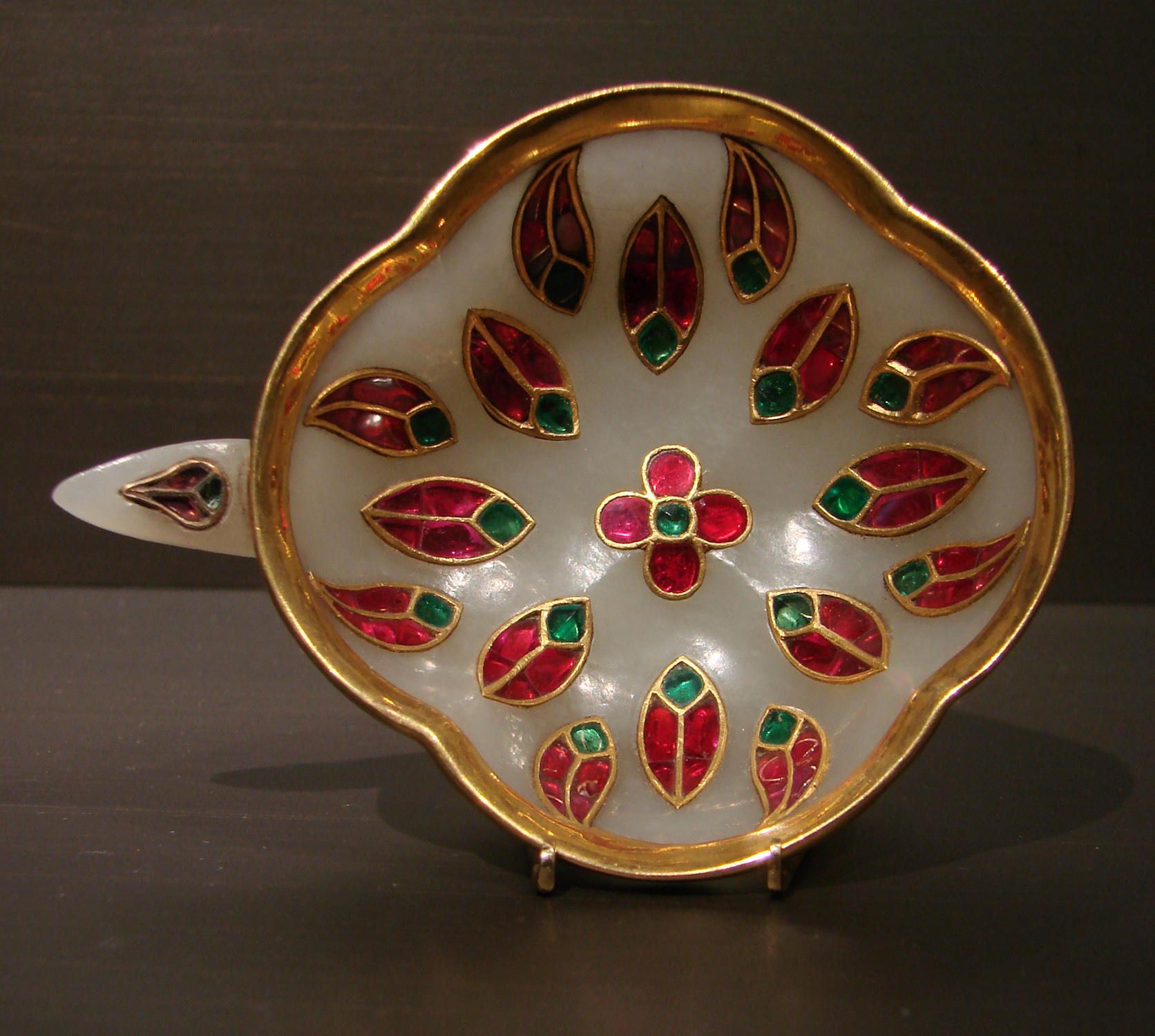
Mughal cup of jade, emeralds, rubies and gold

=== Western traditions ===
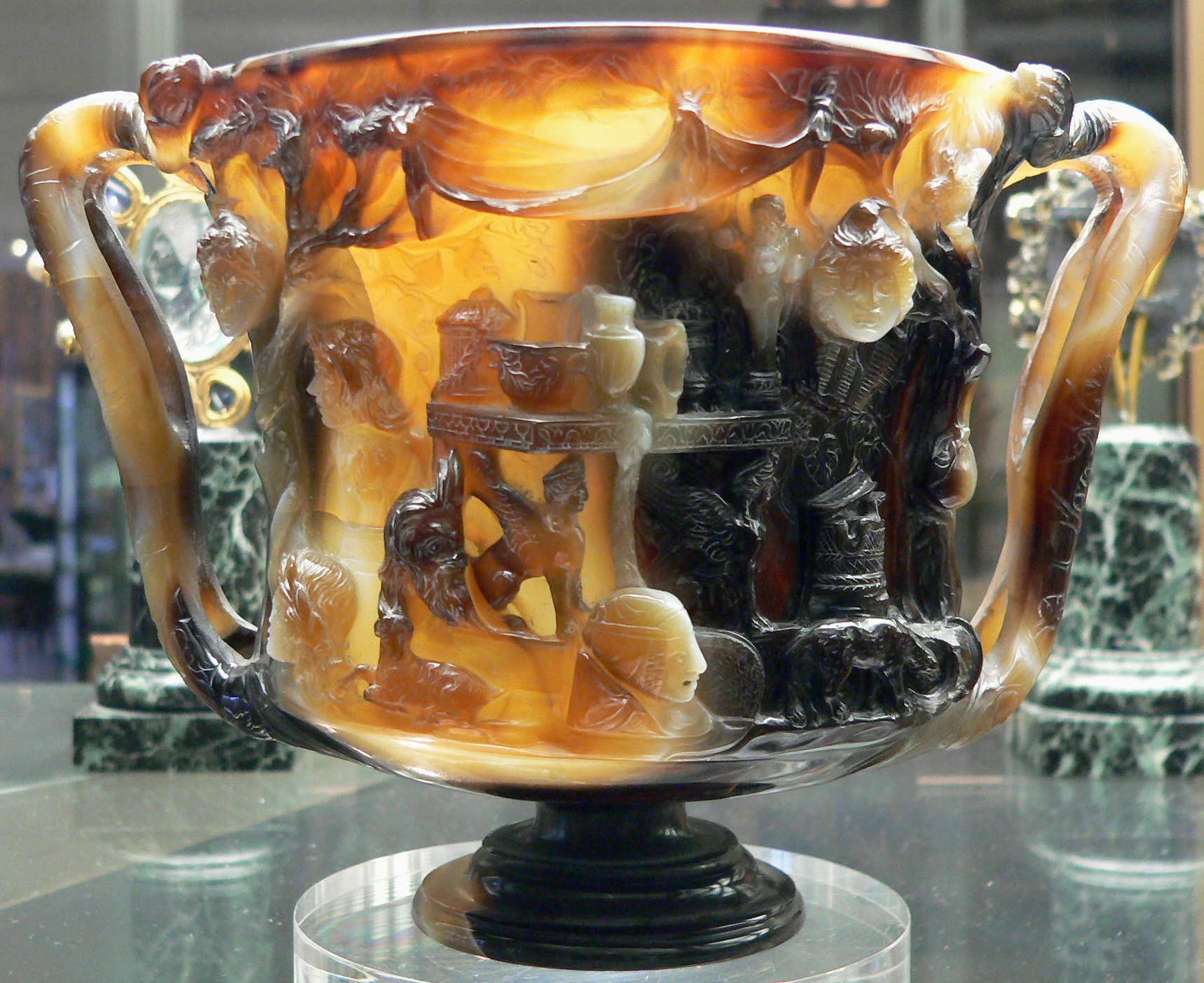
Cup of the Ptolemies in onyx, probably Alexandria, 1st century BCE or CE.

From the early civilizations of the near East descended the carving of vessels and small statues in Ancient Greece, Ancient Rome and subsequent Western art, and also Sassanian Persia; however it is not very significant in the art of ancient Egypt, outside jewellery, as alabaster was a more common material. The jade signet ring of Tutankhamun has been called a "unique specimen" of Egyptian jade. Among the seals of the Minoan civilization during the Aegean Bronze Age, the Pylos Combat Agate dated circa 1450 BC is considered one of the finest works of that era, depicting naturalistic details of the human body comparable to works of the much later Classical period.

Hardstone carving more often refers to vessels and figures than smaller engraved gems for seal rings or made as objéts d'art, which were the main artistic expression of hardstone carving in the Greek Classical and Hellenistic periods, and are regarded separately. From the Hellenistic period elaborate vessels in semi-precious stone begin to appear, mostly carved, some in cameo. The Cup of the Ptolemies and Farnese Cup both appear to have been made in Alexandria in Ptolemaic Egypt, as does a simpler fluted sardonyx cup in Washington which, like the Cup of the Ptolemies, was adapted to be a Christian chalice, and given elaborate gold and jewelled mounts by Abbot Suger for his Abbey of St Denis about 1140. The elaborately carved Rubens Vase, now in Baltimore, is thought to date from the 4th century.

From the Late Antique plainer shapes for vessels appear, concentrating on showing the natural patterns of figured stones - survivals of these are hard to date, and mostly have survived in church treasuries with medieval mounts in goldsmith's work. The best collection of Byzantine liturgical vessels is in the Treasury of San Marco, Venice, some of them booty from the Fourth Crusade. Byzantine artists maintained a tradition throughout the Middle Ages, often working in clear rock crystal. There are a few large pieces from Carolingian art, including the Lothair Crystal, and then a continuing tradition of rock crystal work, often used undecorated in reliquaries and other pieces in the same way as modern glass, for which they are often mistaken by modern viewers. By the end of the Middle Ages a wider variety of stones and objects are seen, used for both religious objects and secular ones.

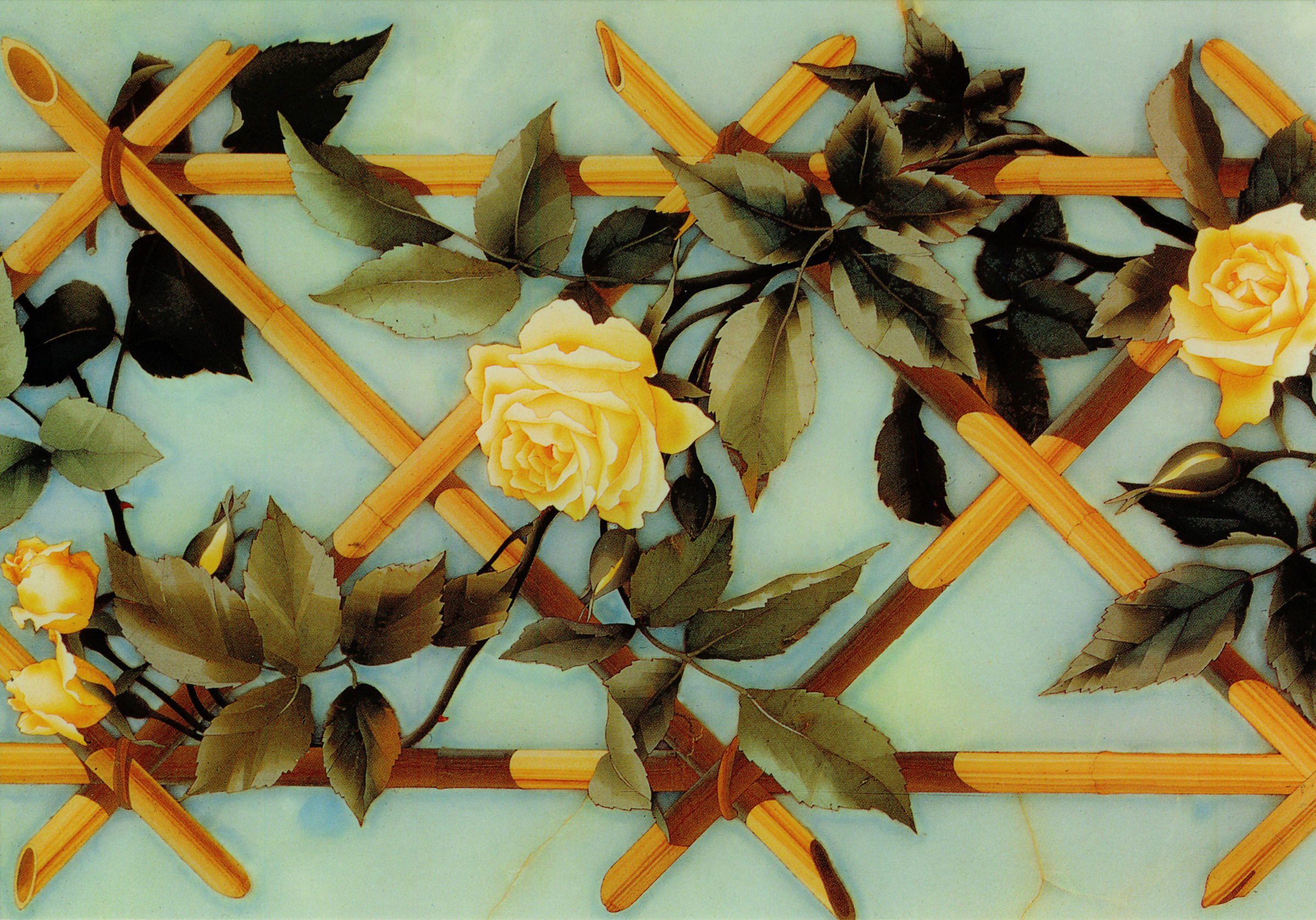
Detail of 19th-century pietra dura panel

The Opificio delle pietre dure ("Hardstone workshop") founded by the Medici in Florence in 1588 soon became the leading workshop in Europe, and developed the pietra dura style of multi-coloured inlays, which use coloured marbles as well as gemstones. They also produced vessels and small sculptures from a single piece of stone, often mounted with gold, which was also a speciality of Milanese workshops. Other rulers followed their example, including Peter the Great, whose Peterhof Lapidary Works, founded in 1721, began the passion among Russian royalty and aristocrats for hardstones. Engraved gem production had already revived, centred on Venice but with artists in many countries, and gems of very high quality continued to be produced until the mid-19th century. The Mannerist court taste of the 16th century delighted in extravagant vessels for serving fruit or sweetmeats, or display as table centrepieces or on sideboards, with hardstones augmented with mounts and bases in precious metal, enamel and jewels. One collection that has remained mostly together is the "Dauphin's Treasure" of Louis, Dauphin of France (1661–1711), which passed to his son Philip V of Spain; over 120 objects are now displayed together in the Museo del Prado, many of which were already over a century old in the Dauphin's lifetime.

In contrast to the vast malachite vases that rather typify Russian carving (picture below), the last notable modern producer was Fabergé in pre-Revolutionary Russia. Before he produced the famous Imperial Easter Eggs he made his reputation with small hardstone figures of animals and people, typically only 25–75mm long or wide, and small vases with a few flowers—the vase and "water" in rock crystal and the flowers in various hardstones and enamel.

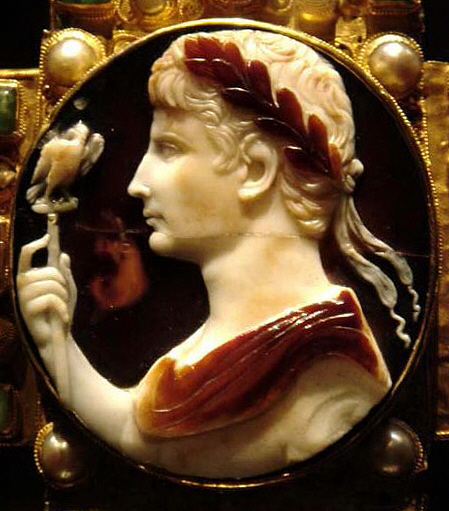
Ancient Roman cameo engraved gem of Augustus

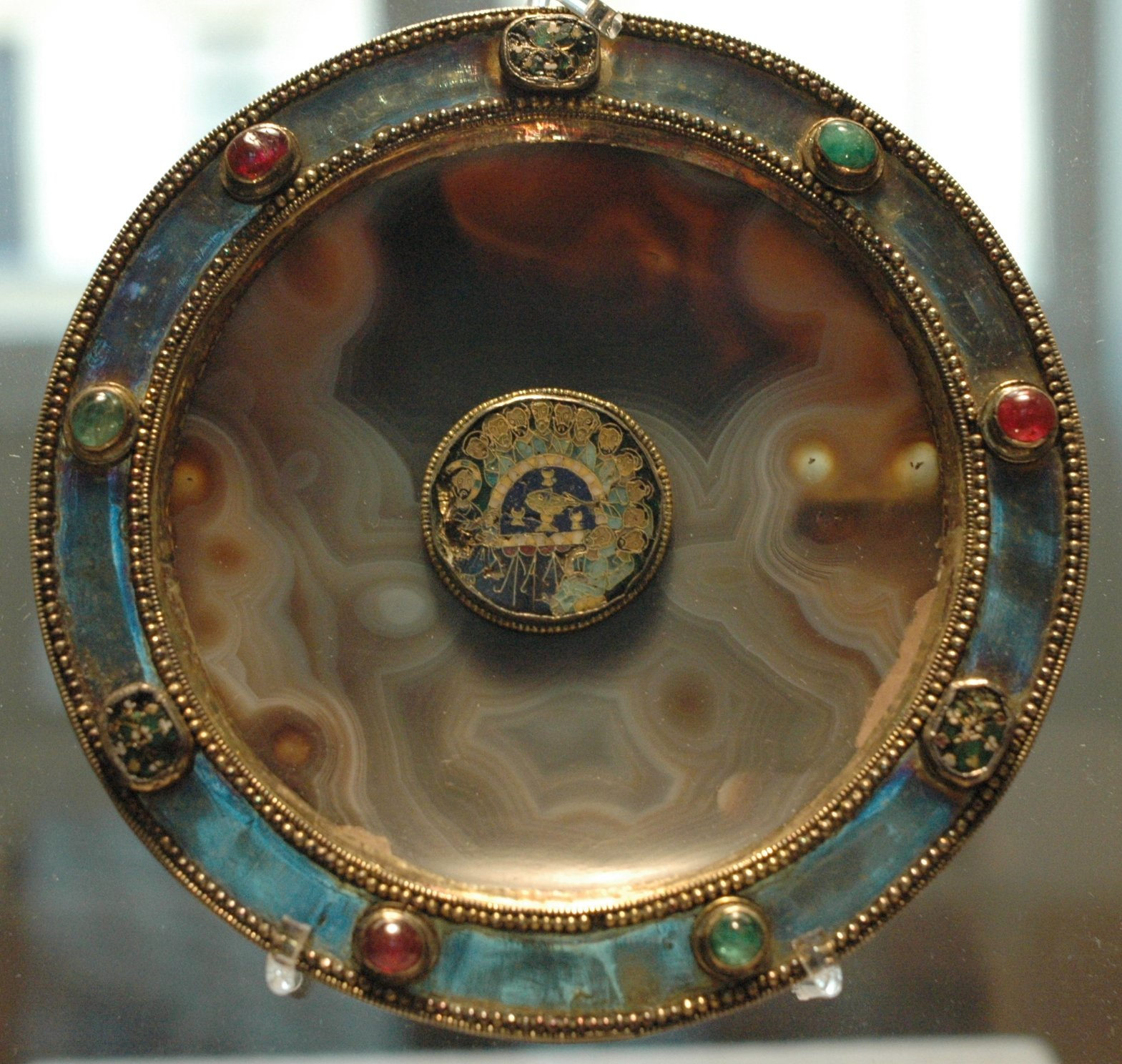
Byzantine paten of sard, 6–7th century(?), with later mounts

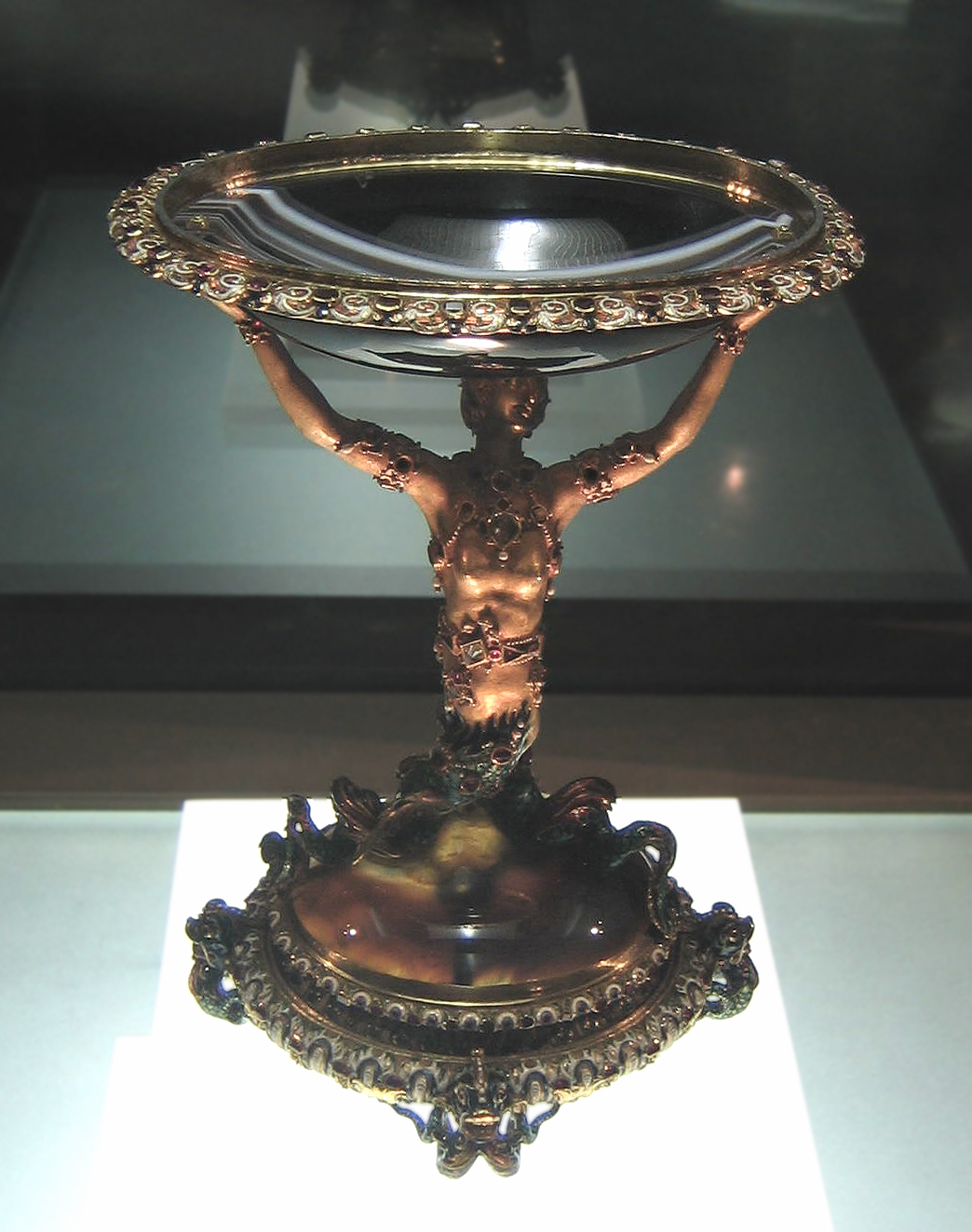
Florentine(?) Mannerist salt cellar, 16th century. Onyx bowl, gold mermaid, with gold and jewelled mounts.

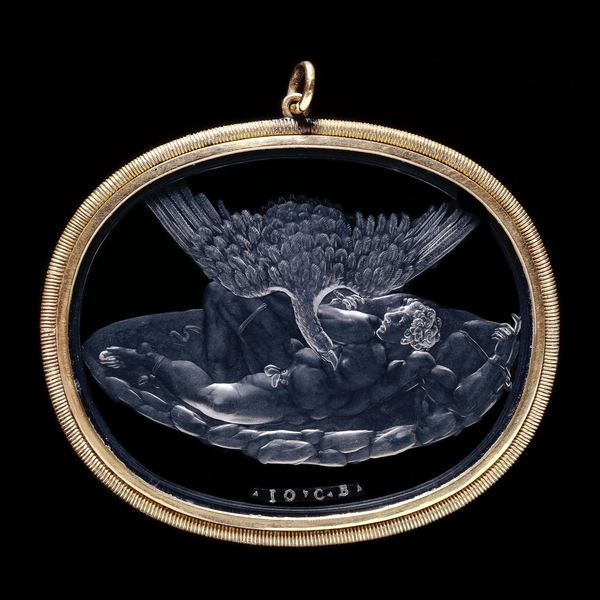
The Punishment of Tityos, a rock crystal intaglio engraved gem by Giovanni Bernardi

=== Pre-Columbian and other traditions ===
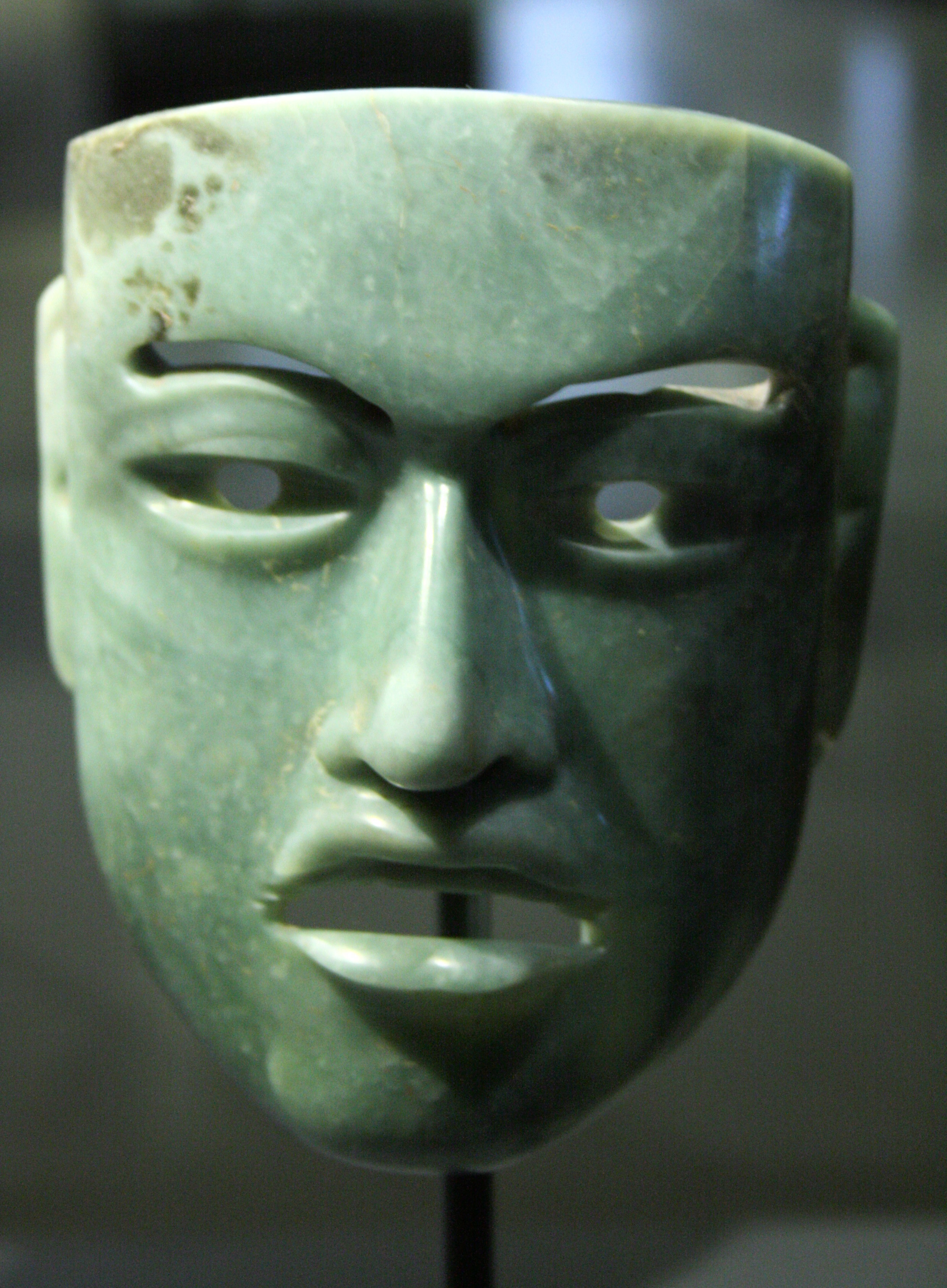
Olmec face mask in jade

Beyond the Old World, hardstone carving was important in various Pre-Columbian cultures, including jade in Mesoamerica and obsidian in Mesoamerica. Because its colour had associations with water and vegetation, jade was also a symbol of life to many cultures; the Maya placed jade beads in the mouths of the dead. Lacking iron, jade was the hardest material the Pre-Columbians were able to work with, apart from emery.

A particular type of object running through the long history of Mesoamerican cultures from the Olmec to the Maya and Aztec is the face "mask" in semi-precious stone (they do not seem to have been for actually wearing), either carved from a single piece or of pieces inlaid on a backing of another material. Curators refer to "Olmec-style" face masks as despite being Olmec in style, to date no example has been recovered in a controlled archaeological Olmec context. However they have been recovered from sites of other cultures, including one deliberately deposited in the ceremonial precinct of Tenochtitlan (Mexico City), which would presumably have been about 2,000 years old when the Aztecs buried it, suggesting these were valued and collected as Roman antiquities were in Europe. The Aztecs' own masks are more typically of turquoise inlay, the Mayans' of jade inlay (see gallery).

Another supposed type of Pre-Columbian hardstone carving is the rock crystal skull; however experts are now satisfied that all known large (life-size) examples are 19th-century forgeries, though some miniature ones may be genuinely Pre-Columbian.

The Māori people of New Zealand, developed the carving of pounamu (jade) for weapons, tools and ornaments to a high standard.

== Techniques ==
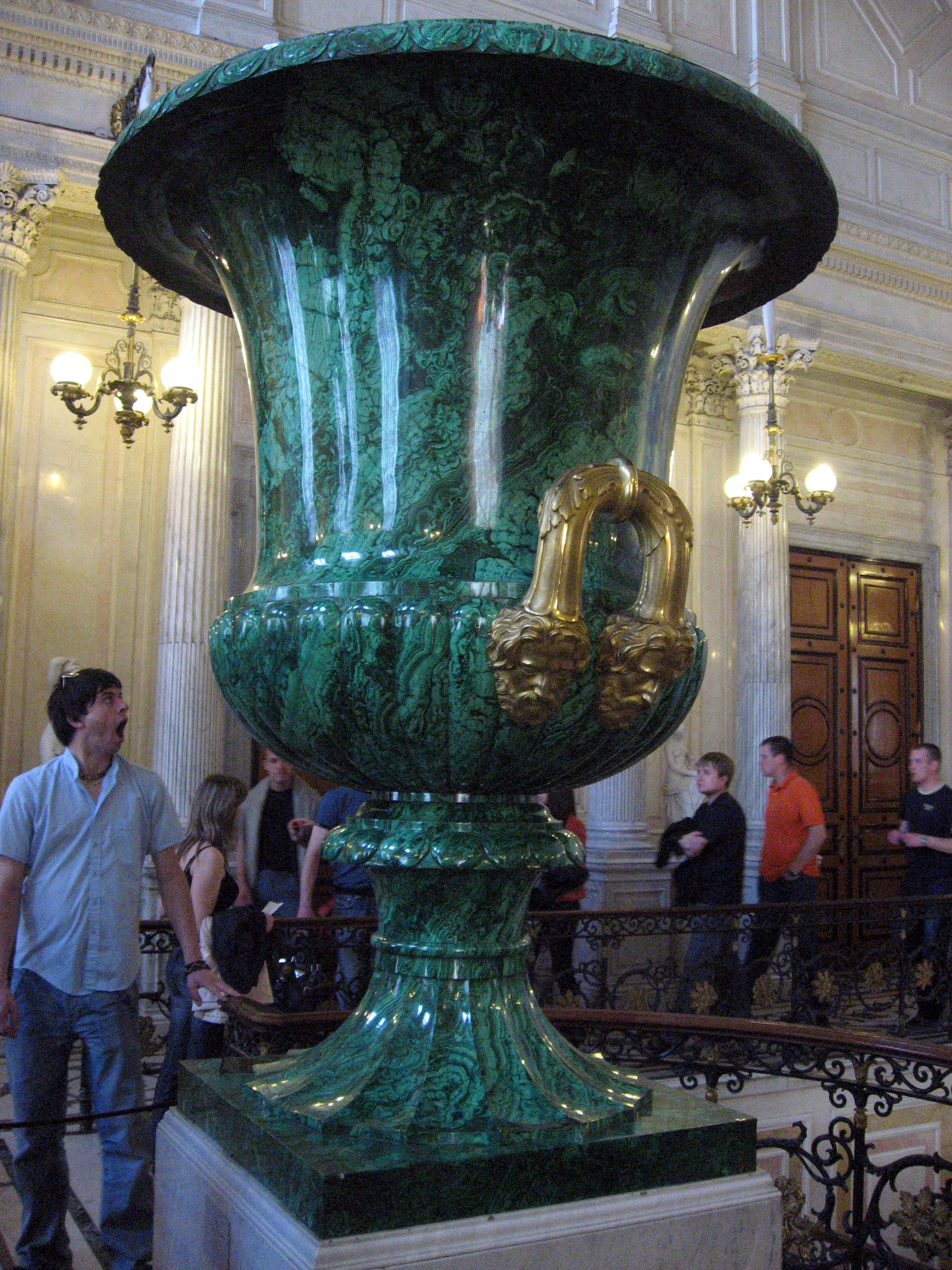
Enormous Neoclassical vase in malachite in the Hermitage Palace, Saint Petersburg

Most hardstones, including jade and quartz varieties, have a crystalline structure that does not allow detailed carving by edged tools without great wastage and a poor finish. Working them has always been very time-consuming, which together with the cost of rare materials often traded from very far away, has accounted for the great expense of these objects. After sawing and perhaps chiselling to reach the approximate shape, stones were mostly cut by using abrasive powder from harder stones in conjunction with a hand-drill, probably often set in a lathe, and by grinding-wheels. Emery has been mined for abrasive powder on Naxos since antiquity, and was known in Pre-Columbian Mesoamerica. Some early types of seal were cut by hand, rather than a drill, which does not allow fine detail. There is no evidence that magnifying lenses were used by cutters in antiquity. The Chinese sometimes tipped their straight drills with less-valued diamonds.

A medieval guide to gem-carving techniques survives from Theophilus Presbyter. Byzantine cutters used a flat-edged wheel on a drill for intaglio work, while Carolingian ones used round-tipped drills; it is unclear how they learned this technique. Mughal carvers also used drills. Inlay sections could be sawed by bow saws. In intaglio gems at least, the recessed cut surface is usually very well preserved, and microscopic examination is revealing of the technique used. The colour of several gemstones can be enhanced by a number of artificial methods, using heat, sugar and dyes. Many of these can be shown to have been used since antiquity — since the 7th millennium BC in the case of heating.

== Imitations ==
As a highly prestigious artform using expensive materials, many different techniques for imitating hardstone carvings have been developed, some of which have themselves created significant artistic traditions. Celadon ware, with a jade coloured glaze, was important in China and Korea, and in early periods used for shapes typical of jade objects. Roman cameo glass was invented to imitate cameo gems, with the advantage that consistent layers were possible even in objects in the round. The small group of 11th(?)-century Hedwig glasses are inspired by Fatimid rock-crystal vessels, and from the 18th century chandeliers in cut glass drew from fantastically expensive rock crystal ones made for the court of Louis XIV. In the Italian Renaissance agate glass was perfected to imitate agate vessels with multicoloured figuration.

Ceramics have often been decorated to imitate gemstones, and wood, plaster and other materials painted to imitate stones. Scagliola developed in Italy to imitate pietra dura inlays on plaster; less elaborate forms are called marbleizing. Medieval illuminated manuscripts often imitated both inlaid stone and engraved gems, and after printing took over paper marbling continued as a manual craft for decorating end-papers and covers.

== Gallery ==
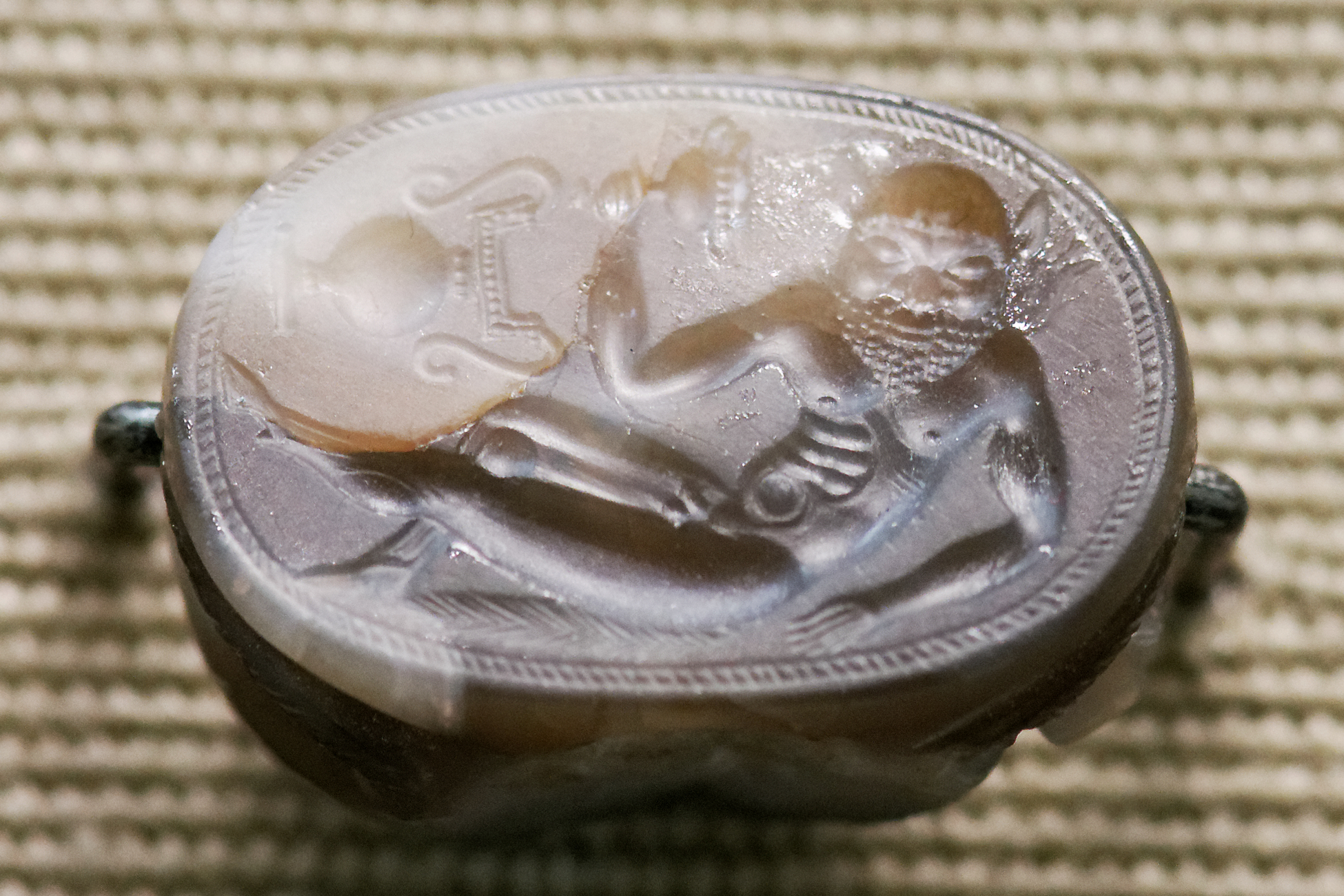
Engraved gem of a reclining satyr, Etruscan c. 550 BC, 2.2 cm wide. Note the vase shown "sideways"; it is characteristic of early gems that not all elements in the design are read from the same direction of view.

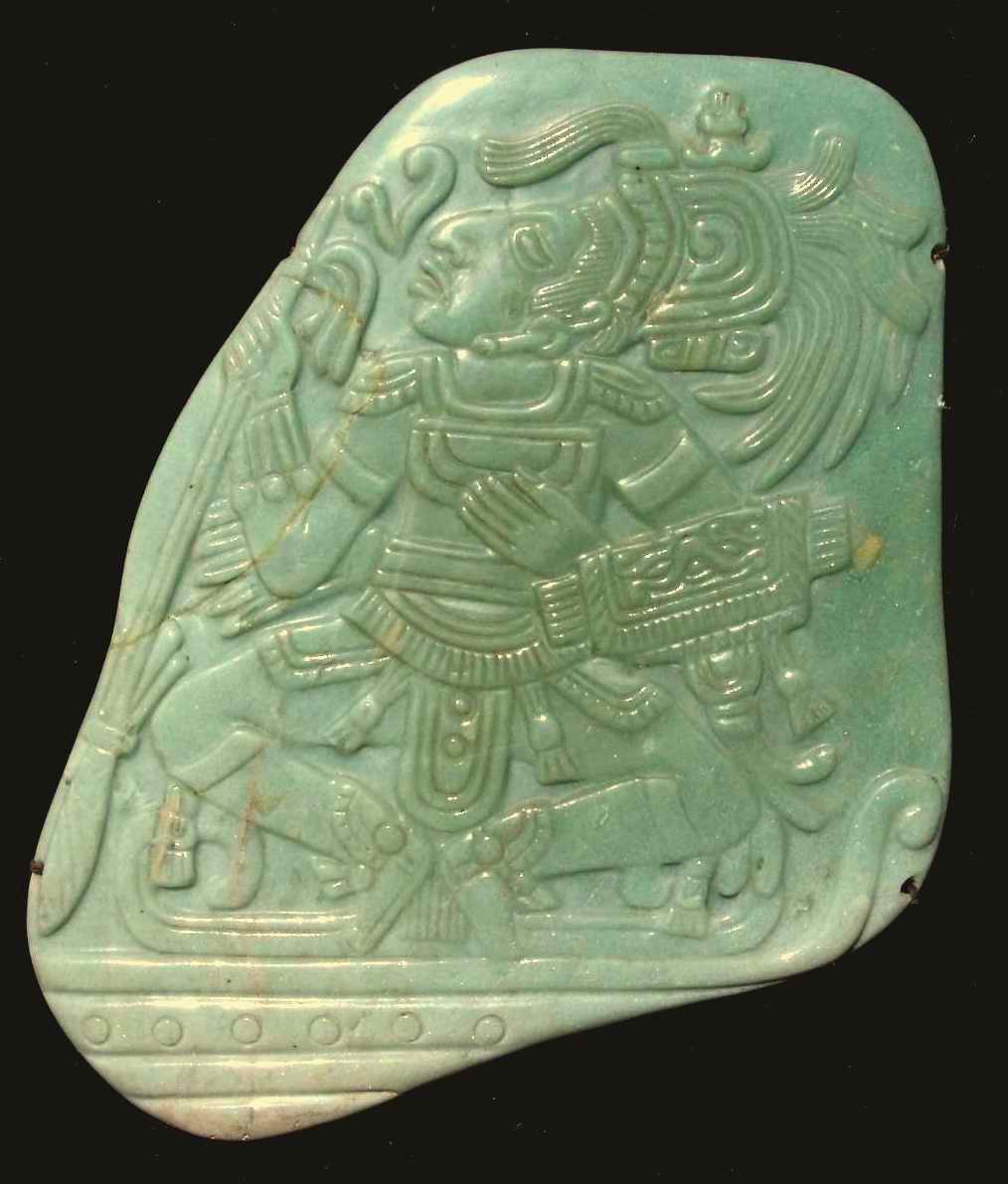
Jadeite pectoral from the Maya Classic Period. (195mm high)

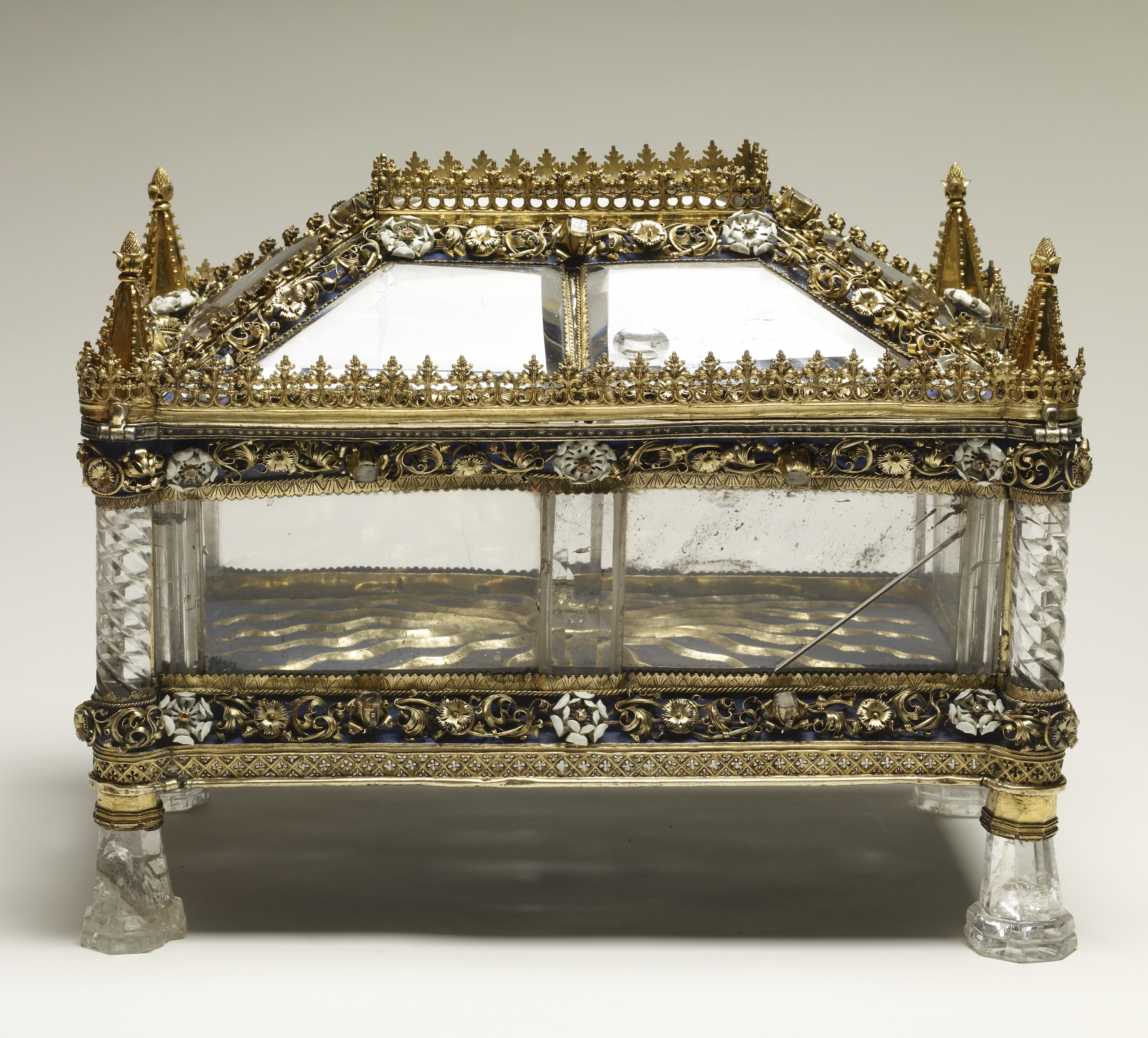
Burgundian reliquary in rock crystal, partially enamelled, late 15th century
