= Lincoln Borglum =

American artist (1912–1986)

- Born: James Lincoln de la Mothe Borglum; April 9, 1912; Stamford, Connecticut, U.S.
- Died: January 27, 1986 (aged 73); Corpus Christi, Texas, U.S.
- Known for: Sculpture, photography
- Father: Gutzon Borglum

James Lincoln de la Mothe Borglum (April 9, 1912 – January 27, 1986) was an American sculptor, photographer, author, and engineer, best known for overseeing the completion of Mount Rushmore after the death of the project's leader, his father Gutzon Borglum, in 1941. One of his best-known works, a bust of his father, is on display outside the Lincoln Borglum Visitors Center at Mount Rushmore.

== Life and career ==
Named after his father's favorite president, Abraham Lincoln, and called by his middle name, Lincoln Borglum was the first child of Gutzon Borglum and his second wife, Mary Montgomery Williams. During his youth, Lincoln accompanied his father to the Black Hills of South Dakota and was present when the site for the Mount Rushmore monument was selected. Although he had originally planned to study engineering at the University of Virginia, Lincoln Borglum began work on the monument in 1933 at the age of 21 as an unpaid pointer.

He quickly moved into a series of more important jobs. He was put on the payroll in 1934, promoted to assistant sculptor in 1937, and promoted to superintendent in 1938 with an annual salary of $4,800.

Gutzon Borglum had nearly completed the sixty-foot (18 m) heads of the four presidents (Washington, Jefferson, Lincoln and T. Roosevelt) when he died on March 6, 1941. Lincoln Borglum had to abandon his father's ambitious plans to carry the work down to include the torsos of the presidents and an entablature due to a lack of funding; he left the monument largely in the state of completion it had reached under his father's direction.

Borglum was appointed Mount Rushmore National Memorial's first superintendent and began work on October 1, 1941. The work on the monument officially stopped on October 31, 1941. He served in that capacity until May 15, 1944.

Borglum continued to work as a sculptor after leaving Mount Rushmore. He created several religious works for churches in Texas, including the well-known shrine Our Lady of Loreto in Goliad. He also wrote three books about the sculpting of Mount Rushmore.

Borglum was a member of Battle River Masonic Lodge No. 92 in Hermosa, South Dakota. Like many of the men who worked on the Rushmore project, Borglum's lungs were permanently scarred from breathing in granite dust associated with the blasting. He died in Corpus Christi, Texas, at the age of 73.

== Selected works ==
- My Father's Mountain (1965)
- Borglum's Unfinished Dream (co-written with June Culp Zeitner, 1976)
- Mount Rushmore: The Story Behind the Scenery (1977)
