= Agate =

Banded variety of chalcedony

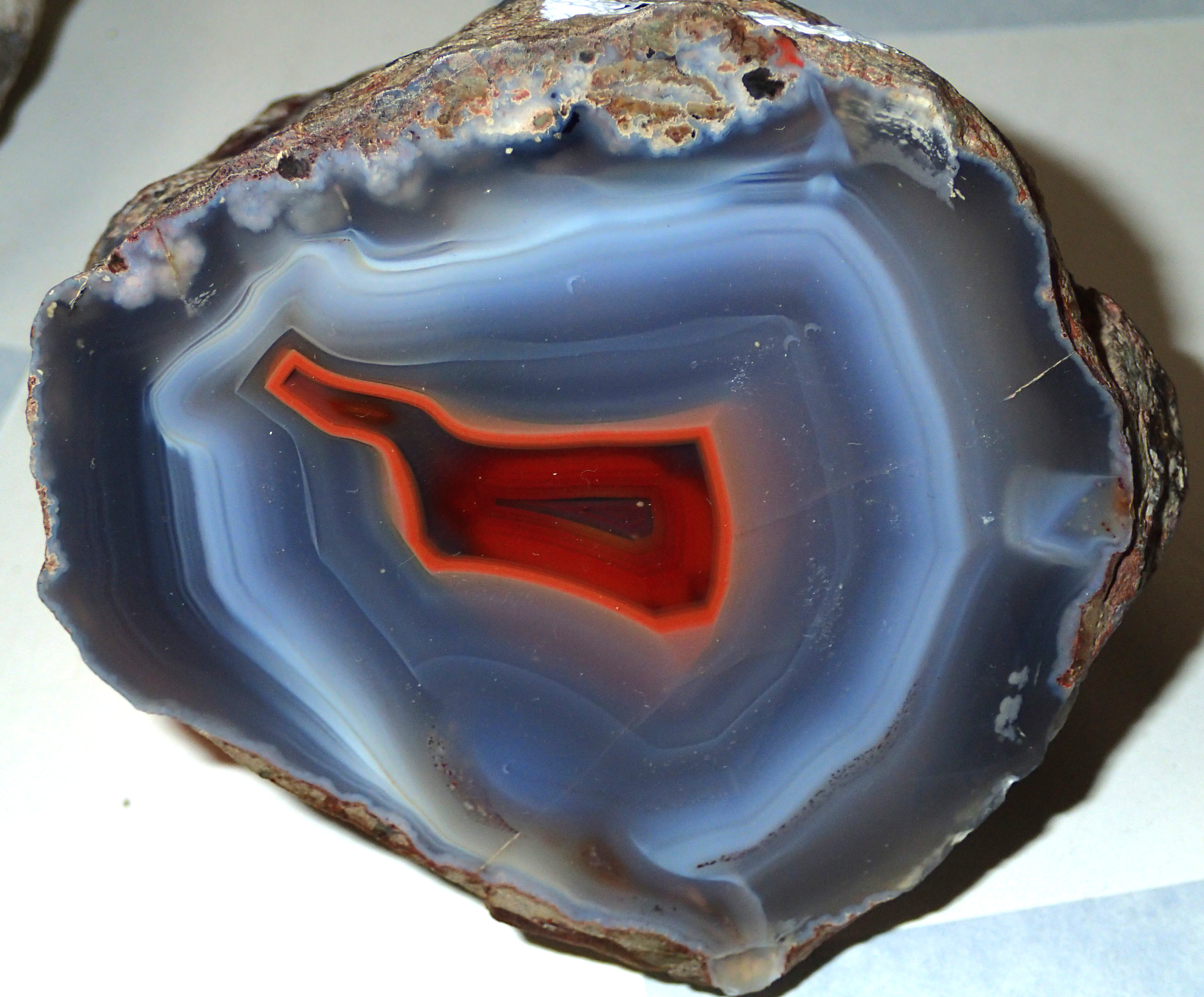
- Polished agate nodule from Malawi

General
- Category: Tectosilicate minerals
- Group: Quartz group
- Formula: SiO_{2} (silicon dioxide)
- IMA status: Variety of quartz (chalcedony)
- Crystal system: Trigonal (quartz) or monoclinic (moganite)

Identification
- Color: Often multicolored; commonly colorless, pale blue to black, red to orange, yellow, white, brown, pink, purple; rarely green
- Crystal habit: Cryptocrystalline silica
- Cleavage: None
- Fracture: Conchoidal
- Tenacity: Brittle
- Mohs scale hardness: 6.5–7
- Luster: Waxy, vitreous when polished
- Streak: White
- Diaphaneity: Transparent to opaque (usually translucent)
- Specific gravity: 2.60–2.64
- Density: 2.6 g/cm^{3}
- Optical properties: Uniaxial (+)
- Refractive index: 1.530-1.543
- Birefringence: Up to 0.004
- Pleochroism: Absent
- Dispersion: None

Agate (/ˈæɡɪt/ AG-it) is a banded variety of fibrous chalcedony. Agate stones are characterized by alternating bands of different colored chalcedony and often contain some visible quartz crystals. They are common in nature and can be found globally in a large number of different varieties. Most agates are concentrically banded, while some have bands that form parallel lines. Certain varieties of chalcedony without bands are commonly called agate (e.g. moss agate, fire agate), but these are not true agates. Moreover, not every banded chalcedony is an agate (e.g. banded chert).

Most agates form as nodules within volcanic rock, either as amygdules or thunder eggs. Agates also form in veins within any rock type and in silicified fossils. The processes that result in agate banding are not well understood; agate has never been made synthetically.

Agate has been popular as a gemstone in jewelry for thousands of years, and today it is also popular as a collector's stone. Many duller agates sold commercially are artificially treated to enhance their color.

== Etymology ==
The earliest known description of agate was c. 350 BCE by Theophrastus, a Greek philosopher and naturalist. According to both Theophrastus and the Roman naturalist Pliny the Elder, it was named for its discovery along the River Achates (Ancient Greek: Ἀχάτης) in Sicily. However, etymologists believe the river was probably named after the stone, and the origin of the name is uncertain. The word agate first appeared in English in the 15th century, derived from the Anglo-Norman French agathe and the Latin achātēs.

== Composition ==
Agate is composed principally of chalcedony, a microscopic (microcrystalline) or submicroscopic (cryptocrystalline) form of silica. Most of the silica in chalcedony is quartz, while less than 5% to 20% is moganite, a quartz polymorph. All forms of silica, including quartz and moganite, have a chemical composition of SiO_{2}. They differ in that quartz has trigonal symmetry while moganite is monoclinic. Over time, the less-stable moganite is converted to quartz; as a result, no moganite has been found in agates dating from before the Silurian period.

Unlike macroscopic (macrocrystalline) quartz, which is anhydrous, the chalcedony in agate normally contains small amounts of water, between 0.5% and 3%. Most is chemically bound in the form of silanol (Si–OH), with lesser amounts of molecular H_{2}O. Silanol presence decreases with age before levelling off at about 0.4% as a side effect of the conversion of moganite to quartz; this is a potentially useful indicator of age in younger agates. Macrocrystalline quartz is also present in most agates, particularly in the center as a solid core or geode, but also occasionally in bands.

Agate may also contain small amounts of opal, an amorphous form of silica containing up to 10% molecular water. Most is in the form of opal-CT, which consists of nanometer-sized crystals of the silica polymorphs cristobalite and tridymite and is therefore not truly amorphous. Fully amorphous opal-A is rare in agates. Like moganite, both varieties of opal are metastable and are eventually converted to quartz.

=== Impurities ===
Agate often contains mineral inclusions or trace elements incorporated into the crystal structure. The most common trace elements present in agate are aluminum, calcium, potassium, sodium, and iron. Iron is responsible for producing the color of most agate bands; red and yellow bands are often colored by microscopic spheres of the iron oxides hematite and goethite, respectively. Manganese, chromium, and nickel may also be present in some colored bands. Some agates contain very small traces of uranium in the form of uranyl ions, causing them to fluoresce green under short-wave ultraviolet light. The most common mineral inclusions in agate are calcite and zeolites.

== Structure ==
=== Fibers ===
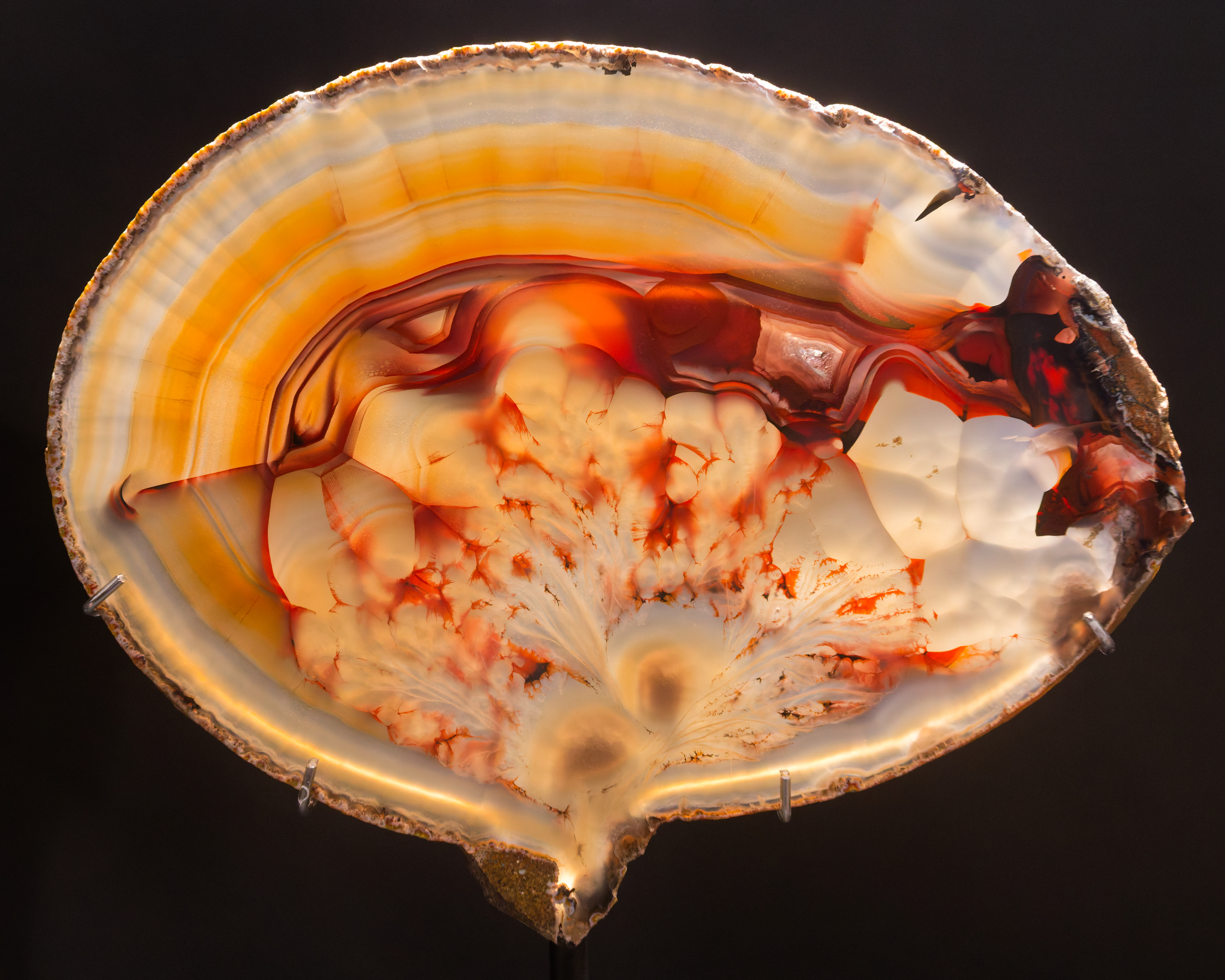
When backlit, thin slices of agate can occasionally show their fibrous structure as lines running perpendicular to the bands (top)

The chalcedony in agate is said to be fibrous, forming chain-like "fibers" of intergrown crystals. These fibers are twisted along their length, giving them a helical shape. Individual fibers were determined by X-ray diffraction to be 0.1-1.0 µm in diameter and up to several millimeters long. There are two different types of chalcedony fibers: length-slow (also known as quartzine) and length-fast. Agate primarily contains length-fast chalcedony fibers, consisting of crystals stacked perpendicular to the c-axis (side to side). Agate rarely contains quartzine, consisting of quartz crystals stacked parallel to the c-axis (tip to tip). Quartzine only occurs in the outer layer of agates or as thin intergrowths between layers of length-fast chalcedony fibers and macrocrystalline quartz.

=== Banding ===
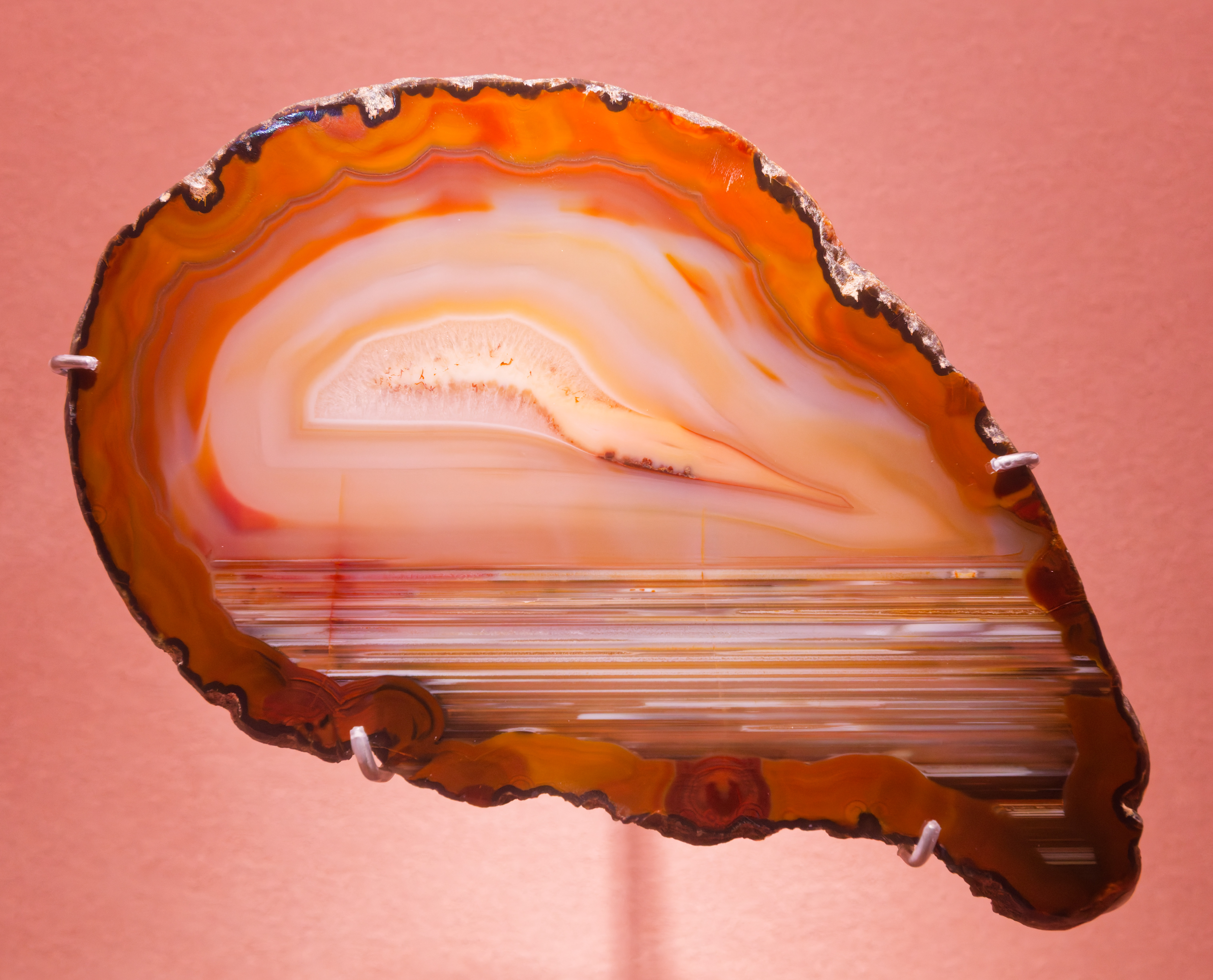
Agate exhibiting wall banding (top) and level banding (bottom)

Agates are broadly separated into two categories based on the type of banding they exhibit:

1. Wall banding (Note: Also called concentric banding, adhesional banding, or fortification banding) occurs when agate bands roughly follow the shape of the cavity they formed in. In wall-banded agates, chalcedony fibers grow radially from the cavity walls inward, perpendicular to the direction of the bands.
2. Level banding (Note: Also called water-level banding, gravitational banding, parallel banding, horizontal banding, or Uruguay-type banding) occurs when agate bands form in straight, parallel lines. In level-banded agates, chalcedony precipitates out of solution in the direction of gravity, resulting in horizontal layers of microscopic chalcedony spherulites.

Level banding is less common and usually occurs together with wall banding. Wall-banded agate is more fibrous than level-banded agate, which is more granular in texture. Consequently, wall-banded agate is denser and more compact.

== Formation ==
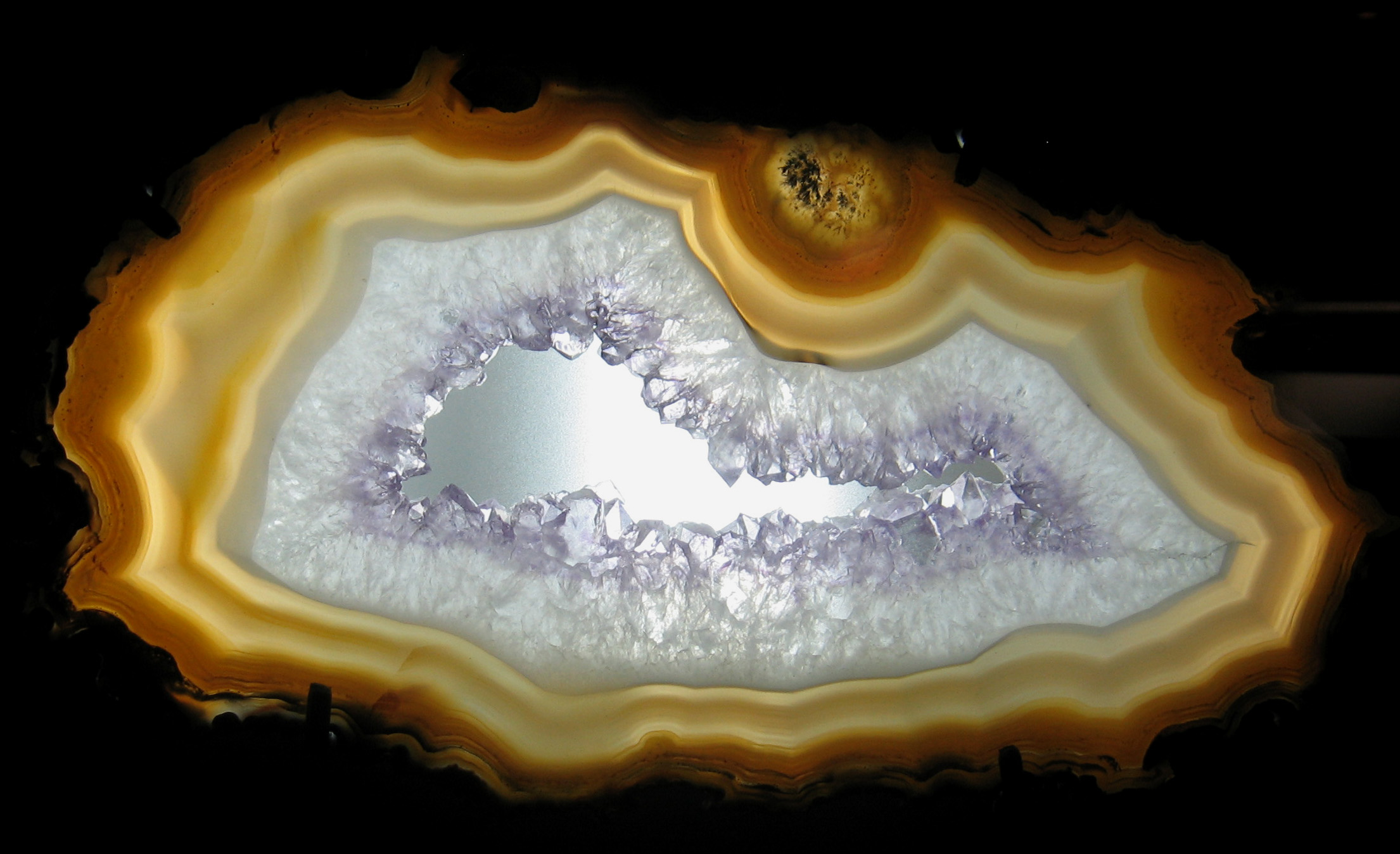
Agate geode slice with macrocrystalline quartz and a hollow center

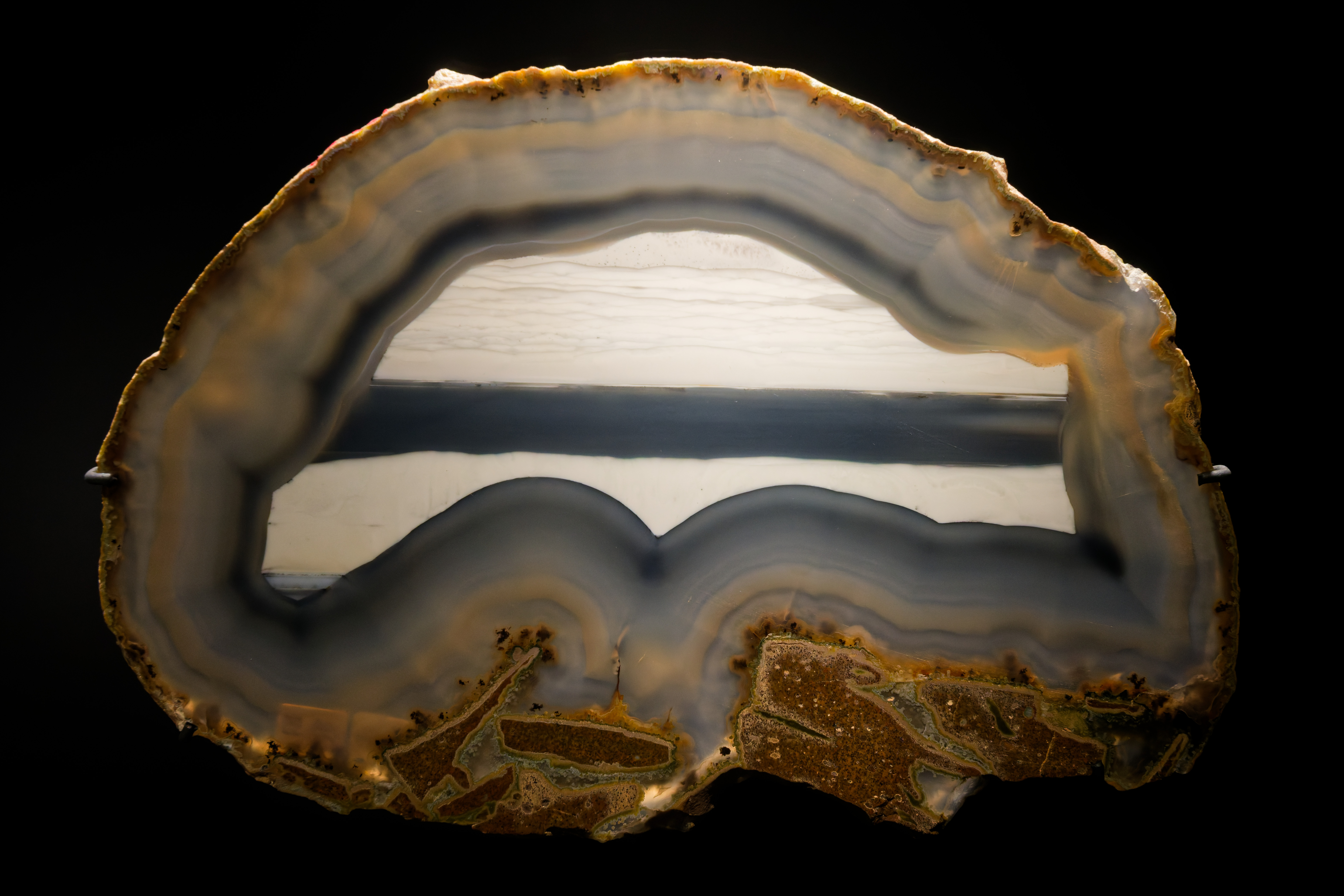
Agate with level banding in the center surrounded by layers of wall banding

Geologists generally understand the early stages of agate formation, but the specific processes that result in band development are widely debated. Since they form in cavities within host rock, agate formation cannot be directly observed, and agate banding has never been successfully replicated in the lab.

=== Nodular agate ===
Agates are most commonly found as nodules within volcanic rocks. In mafic rocks such as basalt and andesite, they form inside cavities called vesicles (amygdaloids (Note: Amygdaloid means "almond-shaped," but they may also be round, irregular, flat, or bun-shaped.) when filled), gas bubbles that were trapped inside the lava when it cooled. Since mafic lavas are poor in free silica, there are multiple theories of where the silica originates from, including micro-shards of silica glass from volcanic ash or tuff deposits and decomposing plant or animal matter. In felsic rocks such as rhyolite and rhyolitic tuff, agates form in spherulite-filled cavities called lithophysae, commonly called thunder eggs when filled with agate.

The cavities are filled with hot, silica-rich water from the surrounding environment, forming a silica gel. This gel crystallizes through a complex process to form agates. Agates are much harder than the rocks they form in; some varieties (e.g. Lake Superior agates) are frequently found detached from their host rock.

In mafic rocks, the vesicle walls are often coated with thin layers of celadonite or chlorite, soft, green phyllosilicate minerals that form from the reaction of hot, silica-rich water with the rock. This coating provides a rough surface for the chalcedony fibers to form on, initially as radial spherulites. The rough surface also causes agate husks to have a pitted appearance once the coating has been weathered away or removed. Sometimes, the spherulites grow around mineral inclusions, resulting in eyes, tubes, and sagenitic agates.

The first layer of spherulitic chalcedony is typically clear, followed by successive growth bands of chalcedony alternated with chemically precipitated color bands, primarily iron oxides. The center is often macrocrystalline quartz, which can also occur in bands and possibly forms when there is not enough chemically bound water in the silica gel to promote chalcedony polymerization. When the silica concentration of the gel is too low, a hollow center forms, called an agate geode. In geodes, quartz forms crystals around the cavity, with the apex of each crystal pointing towards the center. Occasionally, quartz in agates may be colored, occurring in varieties such as amethyst or smoky quartz.

Level bands usually form at the base of the vesicle or in the center when the gel stops adhering to the vesicle walls. This is probably due to a decrease in bound water in the gel.

Less commonly, agates can form as nodules within sedimentary rocks such as limestone, dolomite or tuff. These agates form when silica replaces another mineral, or silica-rich water fills cavities left by decomposed plant or animal matter.

=== Vein agate ===
Agates can also form within rock fissures, called veins. Vein agates form in a manner similar to nodular agates (see above), and they include lace agates such as blue lace agate and crazy lace agate. Veins may form in either volcanic rock or sedimentary rock.

=== Fossil agate ===
Fossil agates form when silica replaces the original composition of an organic material. This process is called silicification, a form of petrification. Examples include petrified wood, agatized coral, and Turritella agate (Elimia tenera). Although these fossils are often referred to as being "agatized", they are only true agates if they contain bands.

== Variations ==
Besides the two fundamental types of banding (wall and level), agates can exhibit a wide variety of band patterns, internal structures, and optical effects.

=== Band patterns ===
- Fortification agates are any wall-banded agates with sharp, well-defined bands. They are named for their appearance, which resembles the walls of a fort. Some authors do not make a distinction between fortification agates and other wall-banded agates.
- Lace agates are vein agates that exhibit a lace-like pattern of bands with many swirls, eyes, bends, and zigzags.
- Faulted agates have bands that were broken and slightly shifted by rock movement and then re-cemented together by chalcedony. They have the appearance of rock layers with fault lines running through them.
- Brecciated agates also have bands that were broken apart and re-cemented with chalcedony, but they consist of disjointed band fragments at random angles. They are a form of breccia, which is a textural term for any rock composed of angular fragments.
- Eye agates have one or more circular, concentric rings on their surface. These "eyes" are actually hemispheres that form on the husk of the agate and extend inward like a bowl.
- Onyx is the traditional name for agates with level banding, although the formal definition of the term onyx refers to color pattern, not the shape of the bands. Accordingly, the name onyx is also used for wall-banded agates. Onyx is frequently misused as a name for banded calcite. The name originates from the Greek word for the human nail, which has parallel ridges. Typically, onyx bands alternate between black and white or other light and dark colors.
- Sardonyx is a variety of onyx with red-to-brown bands alternated with either white or black bands.
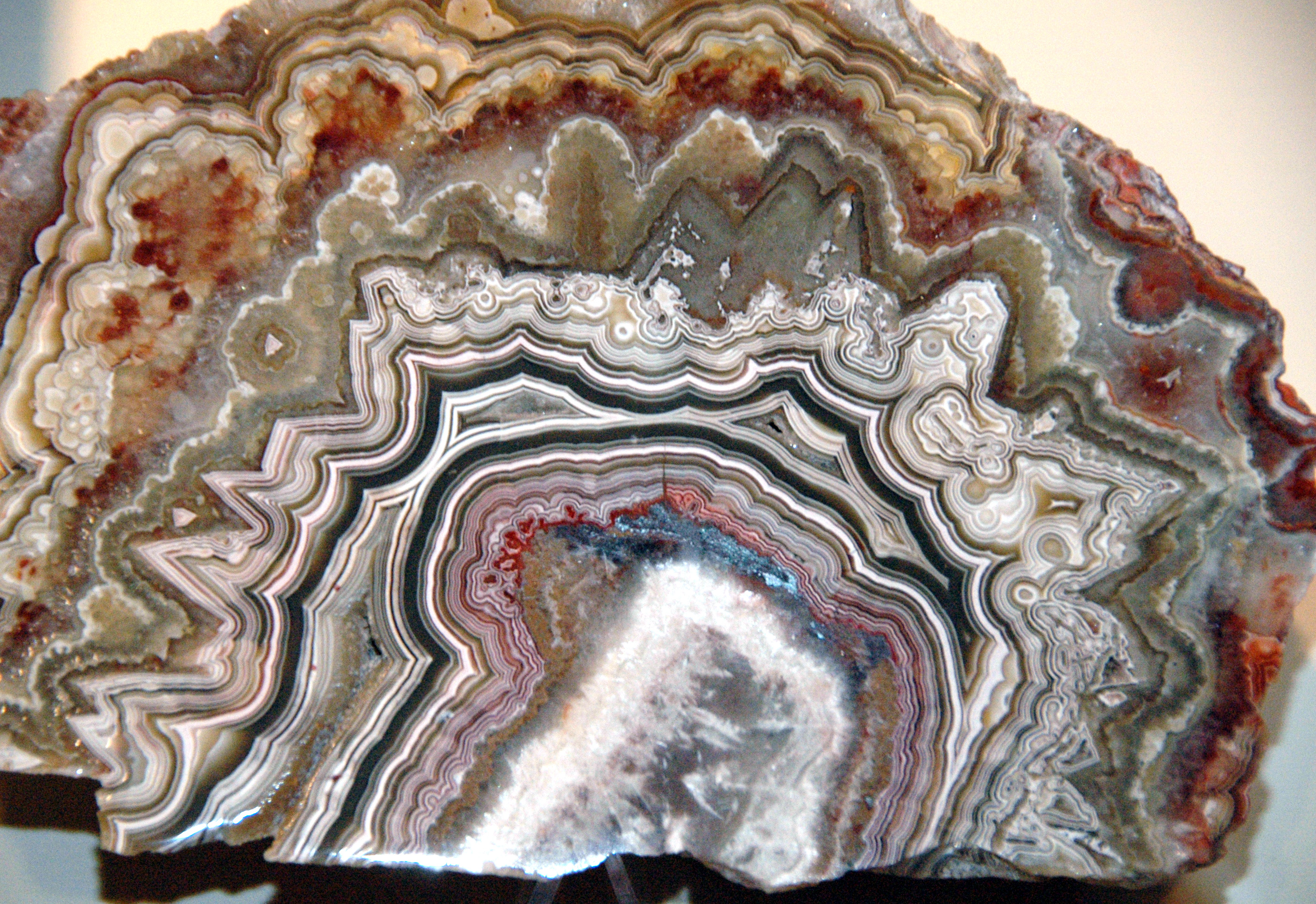
Crazy lace agate from Mexico

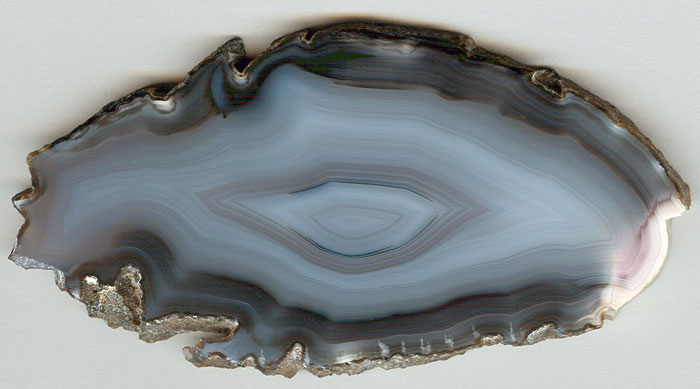
Brazilian agate with classic fortification banding

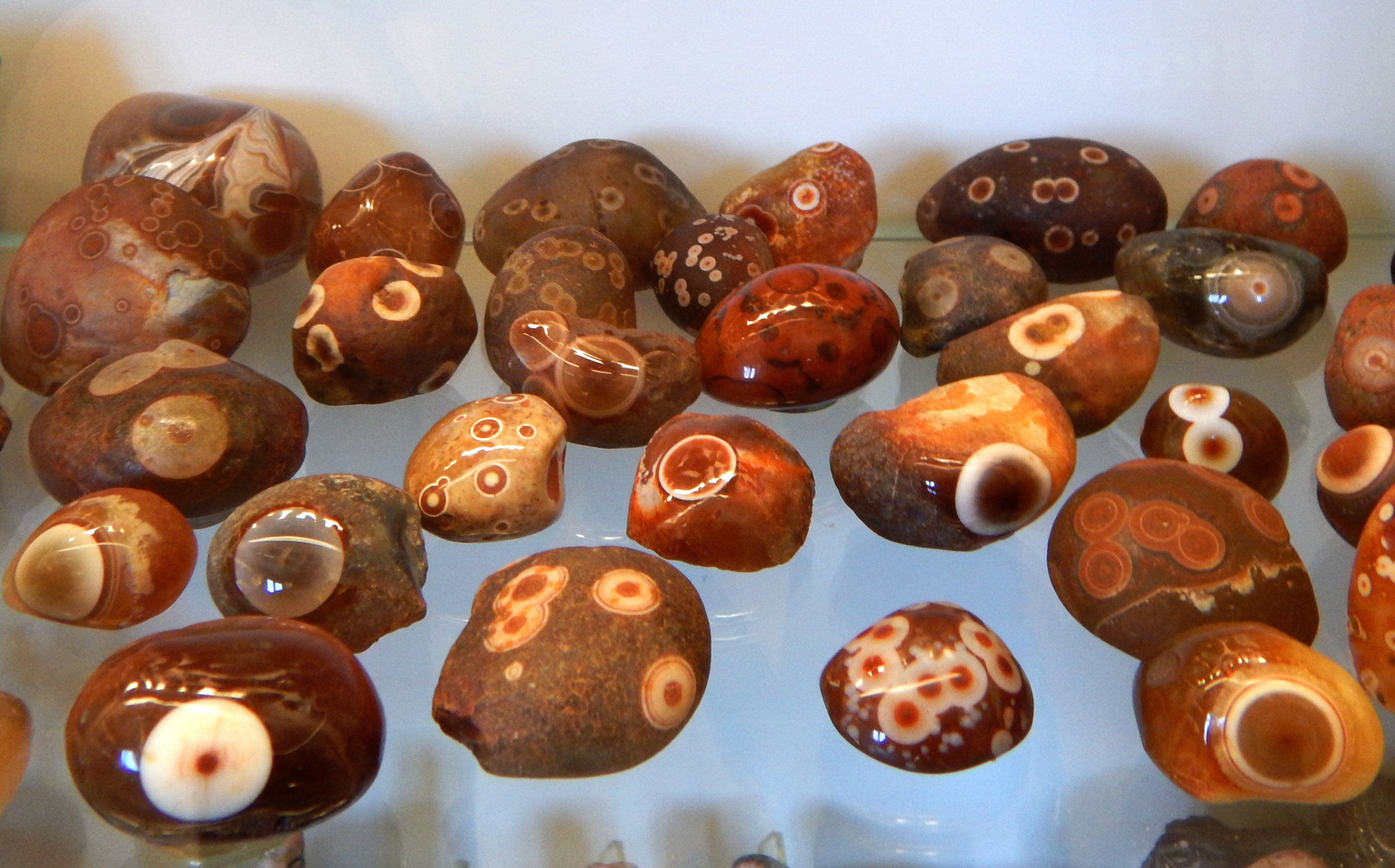
Tumbled Lake Superior eye agates

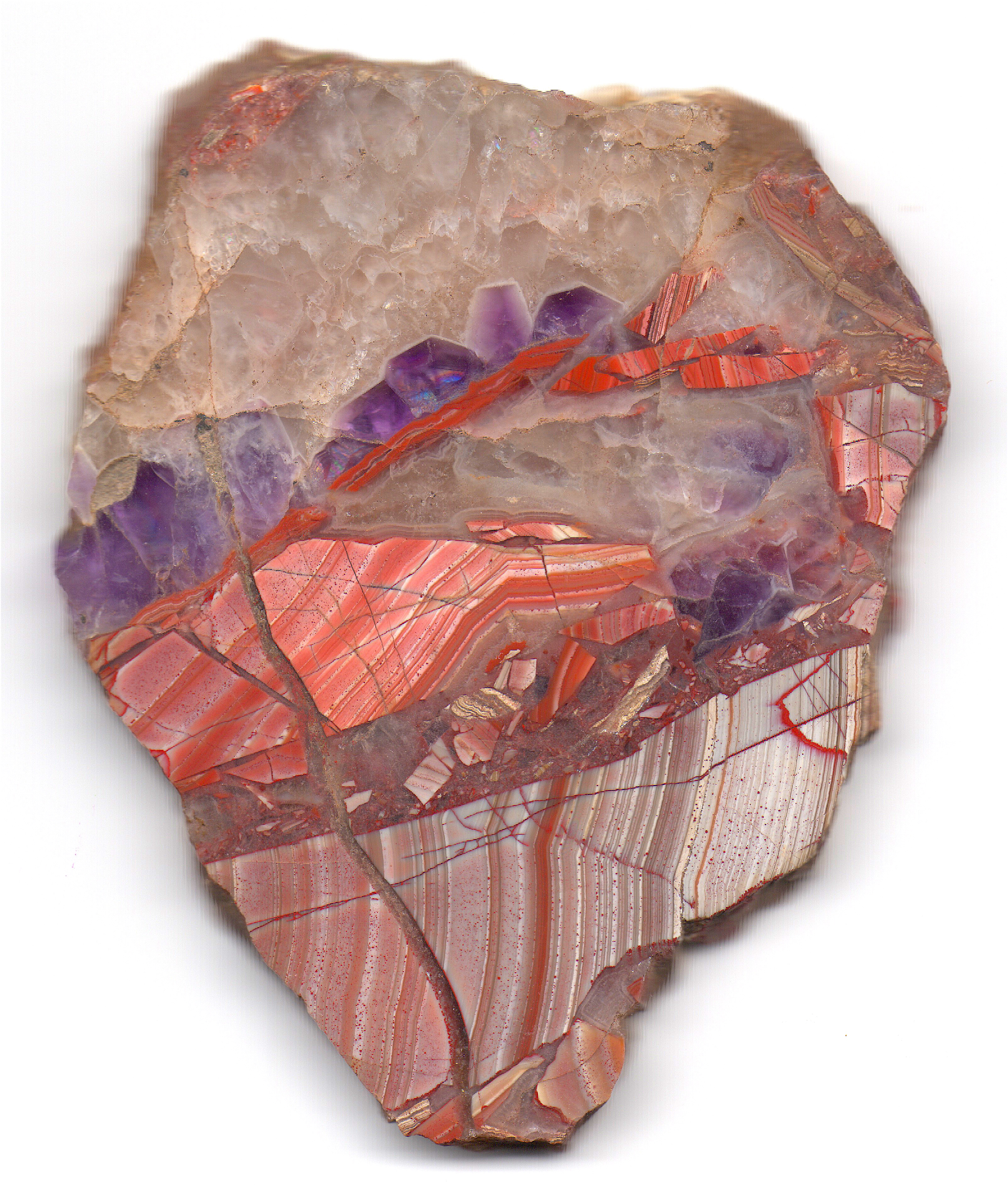
Faulted and brecciated agate and quartz from Maramureș

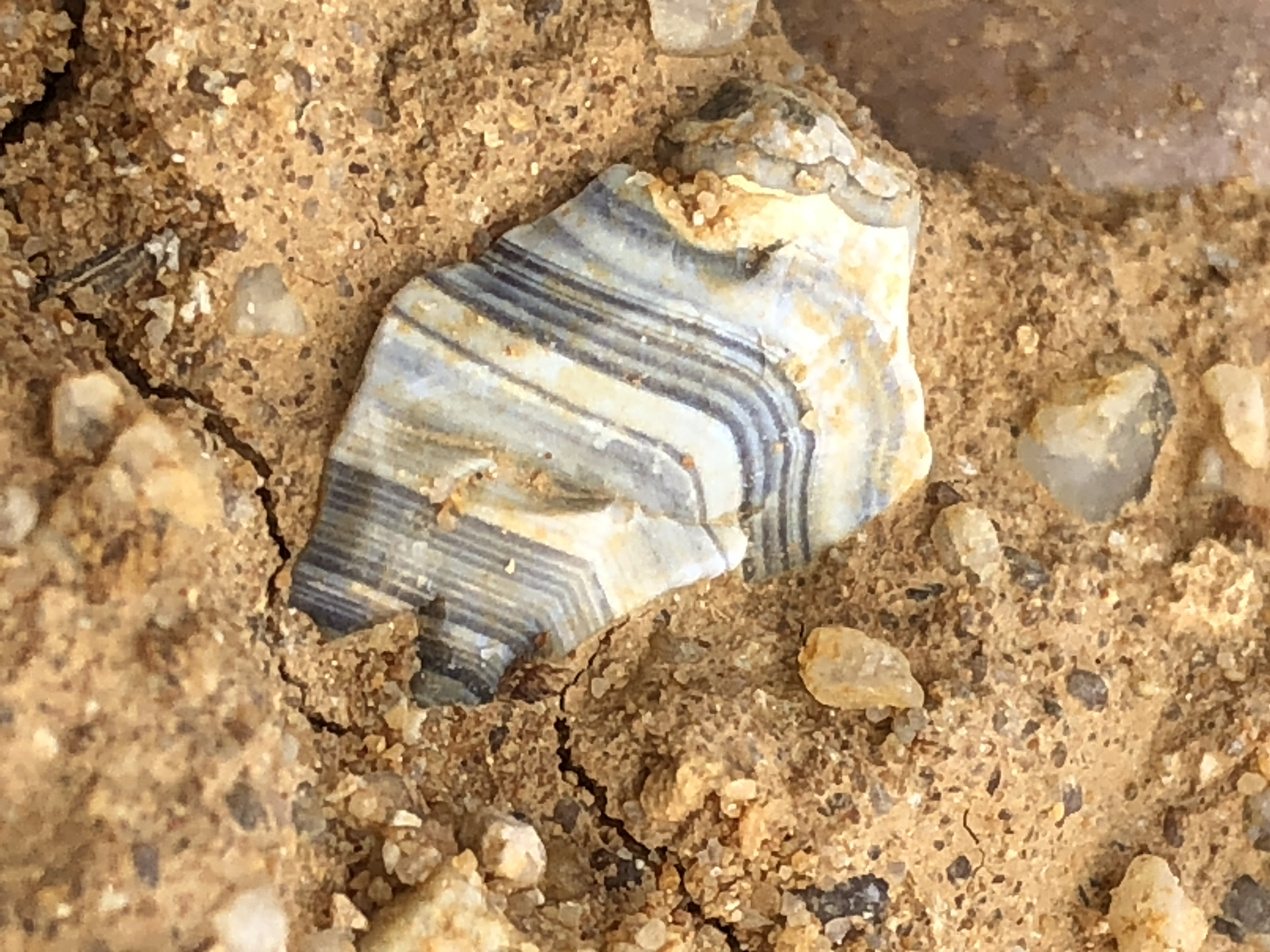
Onyx from Germany

=== Internal structures ===
- Sagenitic agates, or sagenites, have acicular (needle-shaped) inclusions of another mineral, usually anhydrite, aragonite, goethite, rutile, or a zeolite. Chalcedony often forms tubes around these crystals and may eventually replace the original mineral, resulting in a pseudomorph. The term "sagenite" was originally a name for a type of rutile, and later rutilated quartz. It has since been used to describe any quartz variety with acicular inclusions of any mineral.
- Tube agates contain tunnel-like structures that extend all the way through the agate. These "tubes" may sometimes be banded or hollow, or both. Tube agates form when chalcedony grew around sagenitic inclusions embedded within the agate, forming stalactitic structures. Visible "eyes" can also appear on the surface of tube agates if a cut is made (or the agate is weathered) perpendicular to the stalactitic structure.
- Dendritic agates have dark-colored, fern-patterned inclusions (dendrites) that form on the surface of agates or in the spaces between bands. They are composed of manganese oxides or iron oxides.
- Moss agates exhibit a moss-like inclusions and are usually green or brown in color. They form when dendritic structures on the surface of an agate are pushed inward with the silica gel during their formation. Moss agate was once believed to be petrified moss, until it was discovered the moss-like formations are actually composed of celadonite, hornblende, or a chlorite mineral.
- Plume agates are a type of moss agate, but the dendritic "plumes" form tree-like structures within the agate. They are often bright red (from inclusions of hematite) or bright yellow (from inclusions of goethite). Both moss and plume agates usually lack any form of banding, and therefore are not true agates according to the mineralogical definition.
- Enhydro agates, or enhydros, form when bubbles of liquid water become trapped within an agate (or chalcedony) nodule or geode, often long after its formation.
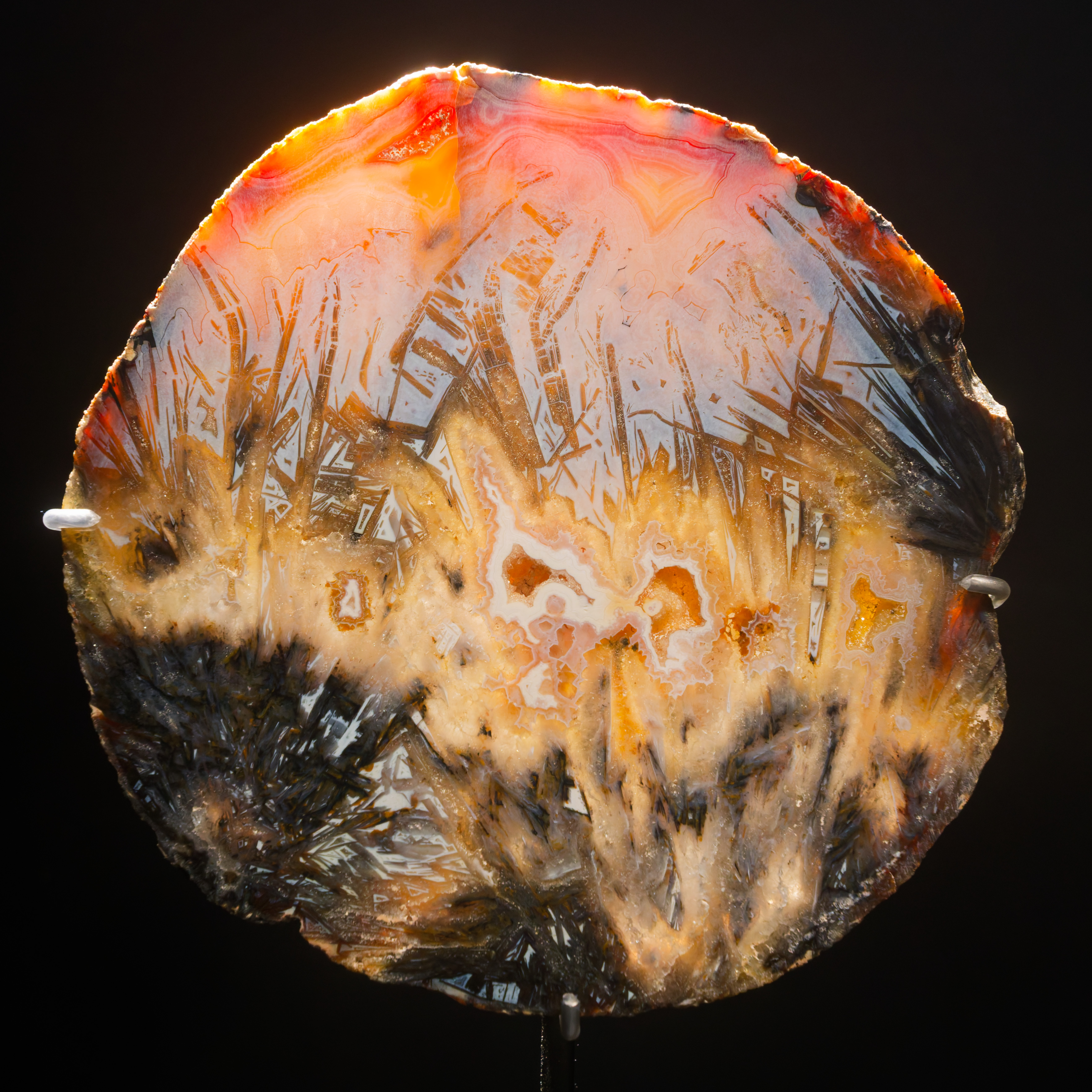
Sagenitic agate from Brazil with numerous needle-like inclusions

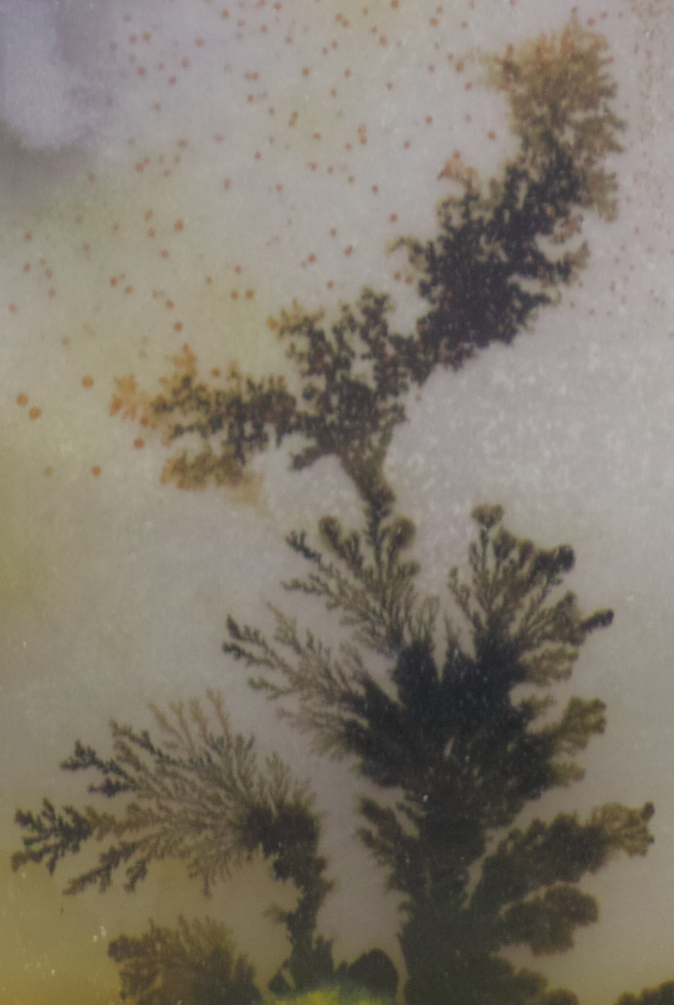
Close-up of a dendrite in an agate from India

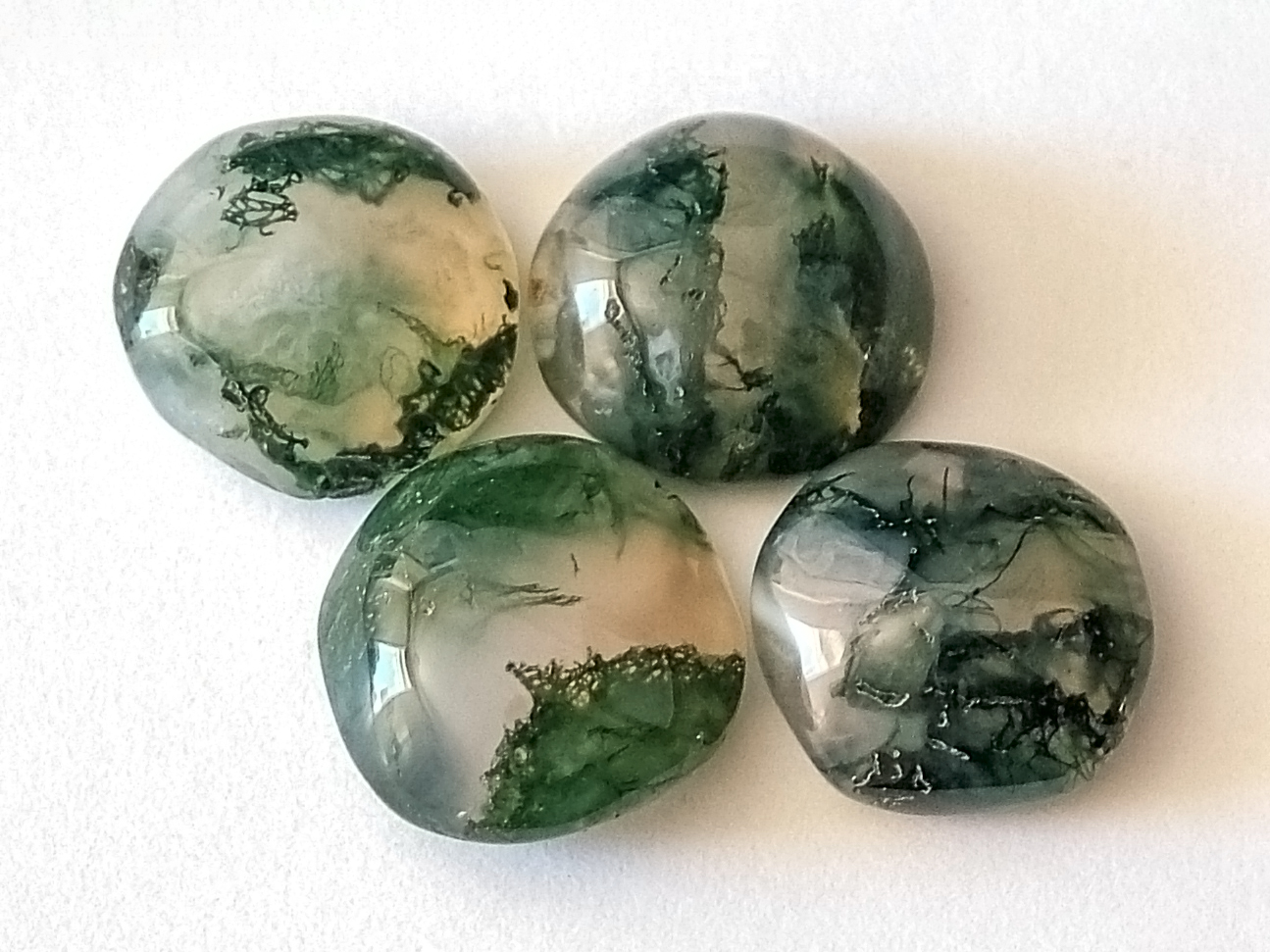
Moss agate cabochons

=== Optical effects ===
- Iris agates have bands fine enough that when thinly sliced, they cause transmitted light to be diffracted into its spectral colors. This "iris effect" usually occurs in colorless agates, but it can also occur in brightly colored ones.
- Parallax banding, also called shadow banding, can occur when an agate has very fine, alternating bands of transparent and opaque chalcedony. Shadows are cast onto the opaque bands which appear to move when the agate is viewed from different angles.
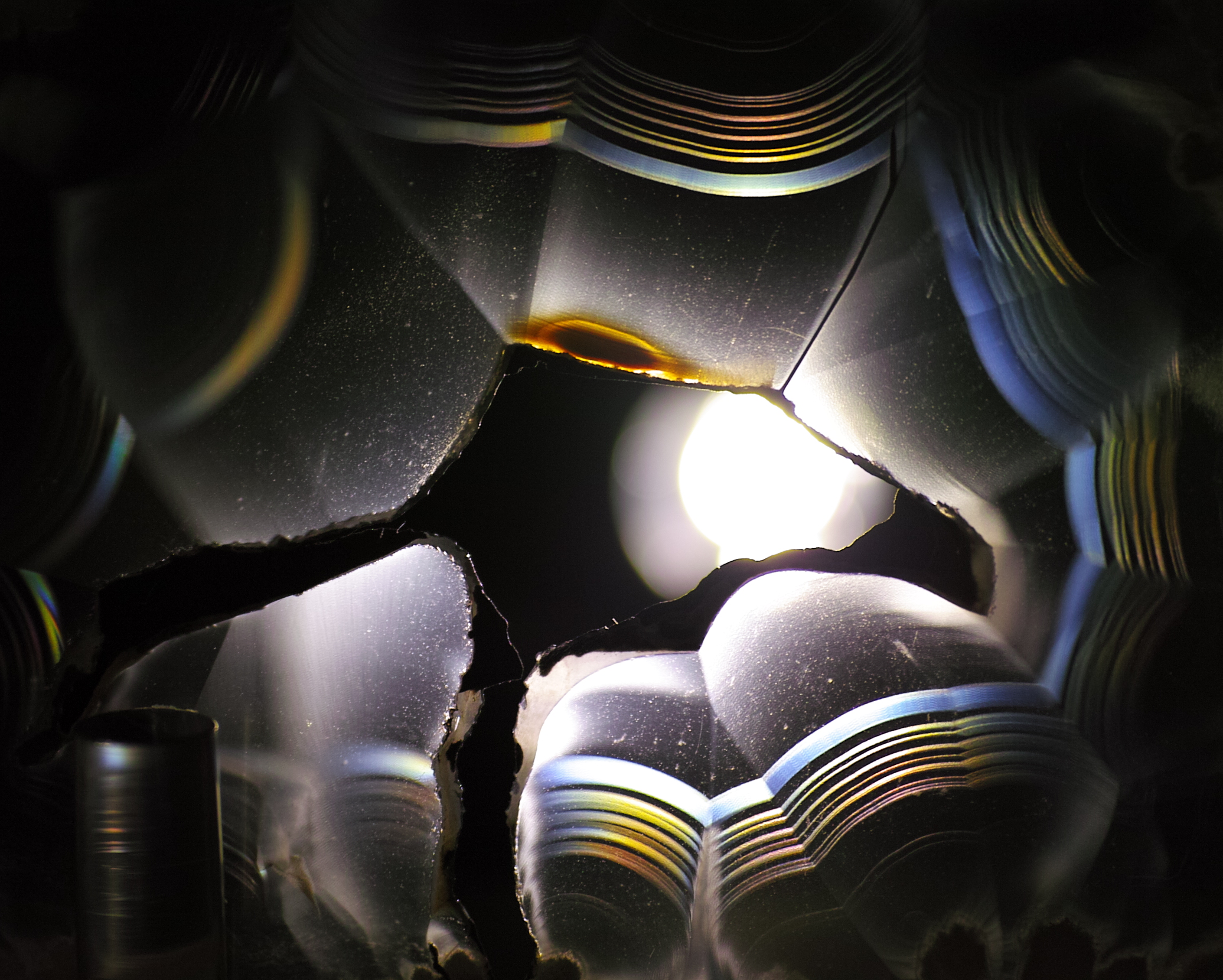
Iris effect in a thin slice of agatized petrified wood from Oregon

Shadow banding in a polished laguna agate slab from Mexico

== Local varieties ==
Agates are very common, and they have been found on every continent, including Antarctica. In addition to the structural varieties detailed in the previous section, numerous geological, local, and trade names are used to describe agates from different localities. Below is a table of agate varieties from different regions of the world.

Local varieties of agate
Name	Locality	Description	Type	Geologic environment	Age	Photo(s)	Ref.
(Unnamed agate)	Bellingshausen Station, King George Island, Antarctica	White and clear bands	Nodular agate			Agate from King George Island, Antarctica	
Blue lace agate	Primarily Namibia; also Malawi, Kenya, Turkey, Georgia, and Zambia	Pale blue and white lace agate	Vein agate	Volcanic rock (dolomite associated with dolerite)	Jurassic period	Blue lace agate from Ysterputz Mine, Namibia	
Blue Bed (Pony Butte) thunder egg	Richardson Ranch (formerly Priday Ranch), northeast of Madras, Oregon, United States	Blue and white banding with dark brown shell, frequently level-banded	Nodular agate (thunder egg)	Volcanic rock (John Day Formation, rhyolitic volcanic ash)	Miocene epoch	Blue Bed thunder egg from near Madras, Oregon	
Boley agate	Central Oklahoma, United States	White fortification and eye banding with clasts of brecciated chert	Vein agate	Sedimentary rock (Boley conglomerate layer, Vamoosa formation)	Virgilian series		
Botswana agate	Botswana	Typically 2.5–5 cm (0.98–1.97 in) in diameter, with contrasting bands of purple, pink, black, grey, and white	Nodular agate	Volcanic rock (Karoo Series, basalt)	Permian period	Botswana agate	
Brazilian agate	Rio Grande do Sul and other southeastern states, Brazil	Often large, up to 0.9 m (3.0 ft) in diameter and over 120 kg (260 lb), commonly pale yellow, gray, or colorless (usually sold artificially dyed), some are more colorful or contain structural features	Nodular agate	Volcanic rock (decomposed volcanic ash and basalt)	Late Permian period	Natural Brazilian agate Dyed Brazilian agate	
Condor agate	Mendoza, Argentina	Bright red and yellow fortification banding, may contain mossy or sagenitic inclusions	Nodular agate			Condor agate	
Coldwater agate (Lake Michigan cloud agate)	Great Lakes Region, United States	Banded lines of grey and white chalcedony	Nodular agate	Sedimentary rock (marine limestone and dolomite)			
Crater agate	Patagonia, Argentina	Typically hollow, black with red bands near the center	Nodular agate	Volcanic rock (rhyolite)	Jurassic period		
Crazy lace agate	Mexico	Brightly colored lace agate, typically white and red, sometimes yellow and grey	Vein agate	Sedimentary rock	Late Cretaceous period	Crazy lace agate	
Crowley's Ridge agate	Crowley's Ridge, Arkansas and Missouri, United States	Pale yellow to tan fortification banding, rarely pink to red (purportedly due to heating in wildfires). Also found along the Mississippi River basin in Mississippi and Louisiana.	Nodular agate	Sedimentary rock	Paleozoic era (deposited in Pliocene gravel)		
Dugway geode	Utah, United States	Light grey to blue, often contain hollow cavities lined with drusy quartz	Nodular agate (thunder egg)			Dugway geode from Utah	
Fairburn agate	South Dakota and Nebraska, United States	Red fortification banding	Nodular agate	Sedimentary rock (marine carbonate sediments)	Pennsylvanian period	Fairburn agate from western South Dakota	
German agate	Near Idar-Oberstein, Germany	Often red or pink, sometimes other colors	Nodular agate	Volcanic rock	Permian period	German agate from Idar-Oberstein	
Holley (Holly) blue agate	Near Holley, Oregon, United States	Lavender to blue	Nodular agate			Holley blue agate from Oregon	
Kentucky agate (Imperial agate)	East Central Kentucky, predominantly Estill County	Bands may be gray, yellow, orange, red, or black; specimens with strong red and black bands are often called "Imperial agate"	Nodular agate	Sedimentary rock (Borden Formation, shale and siltstone)	Early Mississippian	Kentucky agate	
Laguna agate	Ojo Laguna, Chihuahua, Mexico	Vibrant bands in shades of red, orange, pink, or purple, often exhibit parallax or shadow banding, inclusions common	Nodular agate	Volcanic rock (andesite)	Tertiary period	Laguna agate	
Lake Superior agate	Near Lake Superior, United States and Canada	Bands in shades of red, orange, yellow, brown, white, and grey, level banding and various structural features common	Nodular agate	Volcanic rock (basalt)	Late Precambrian (can be found in Pleistocene glacial deposits)	Rough Lake Superior agate from Keweenaw Peninsula, Michigan	
Lysite agate	Lysite Mountain, Fremont County, Wyoming, United States	Colorful bands with plumes and moss	Vein agate	Sedimentary rock (marine origin)		Lysite agate from Wyoming	
Malawi agate	Malawi	Typically bright red or orange with contrasting white bands, some are pink and blue	Nodular agate	Volcanic rock	Permian period	Malawi agate	
Potato stone (Pot stone)	Bristol and Somerset, England, United Kingdom	Irregularly-shaped, reddish, banded agate nodules, typically surrounding a hollow cavity lined with macroscopic quartz, but sometimes completely filled	Nodular agate	Sedimentary rock (dolomitic conglomerate and marl)	Triassic period	Potato stone from England	
Puma agate	Andes, Patagonia, Argentina	Agatized coral	Fossil agate	Sedimentary rock (marine)			
Queensland agate	Queensland, Australia	Often green or yellow-green (colors that are rarely found in other regions), frequently level-banded	Nodular agate	Volcanic rock (basaltic lava flows)	Late Permian period	Queensland agate with level banding	
Scottish agate	Stonehaven to just south of Ayr, near Oban, and surrounding the Cheviot Hills, Scotland, United Kingdom	Various colored bands	Nodular agate	Volcanic rock (andesite)	Early Devonian period	Close-up of a Scottish agate from Ayrshire	
Small Isles agate	Islands off the west coast of Scotland, United Kingdom	Various colored bands	Nodular agate	Volcanic rock (basalt)	Tertiary period		
Sweetwater agate	Near Sweetwater River, Wyoming, United States	Small moss agates with brown or black dendrites, fluorescent under UV light	Nodular agate	Sedimentary rock (sandstone)	Miocene epoch		
Teepee Canyon agate	Black Hills, Custer County, South Dakota	Fortification agate; exhibits red, pink, cream, black, and white banding	Nodular agate	Sedimentary rock (limestone)		Teepee Canyon agate featuring several pockets of red fortification banding	
Turritella agate	Wyoming, United States	Brown fossil agate with the elongated spiral shells of an extinct freshwater snail (Elimia tenera)	Fossil agate	Sedimentary rock (Green River Formation)	Eocene epoch	Turritella agate (Elimia tenera)	

== Uses ==
Agate is frequently used as a gemstone in jewelry such as pins, brooches, necklaces, earrings, and bracelets. Agates have also historically been used in the art of hardstone carving to make knives, inkstands, seals, marbles, and other objects. Today, they are widely used to make beads, decorative displays, carvings, and cabochons, as well as face-polished and tumble-polished specimens of varying size and origin. Agate collecting is a popular hobby, and agate specimens can be found in numerous gift shops, museums, galleries, and private collections.

Industrial uses of agate exploit its hardness, ability to retain a highly polished surface finish and resistance to chemical attack. Historically, it was used to make bearings for highly accurate laboratory balances and mortars and pestles to crush and mix chemicals. During the Second World War, black agate beads mined from Queensland, Australia were used in the turn and bank indicators of military aircraft.

Agates, particularly moss agates, were first used during the Stone Age to make tools such as arrow and spear points, needles, and hide scrapers. Artifacts from as early as 7000 BCE have been found in Mongolia, and the Natufian people of the Levant are known to have made knives and arrowheads from moss agate as early as 10000 BCE. Agate jewelry from Sumeria has been dated to c. 2500 BCE, and the Ancient Egyptians, Mycenaeans, and Romans all used agate in their jewelry. Archaeological recovery at the Knossos site on Crete illustrates the role of agates in Bronze Age Minoan culture. The ornamental use of agate was common in ancient Greece, in assorted jewelry and in the seal stones of Greek warriors.

Idar-Oberstein was a historically important location in Germany that made use of agate on an industrial scale, dating back to c. 1375 CE. Originally, locally found agates were used to make all types of objects for the European market, but it became a globalized business around the turn of the 20th century. Idar-Oberstein began to import large quantities of agate from Brazil, as ship's ballast. Making use of a variety of proprietary chemical processes, they produced colored beads that were sold around the globe.

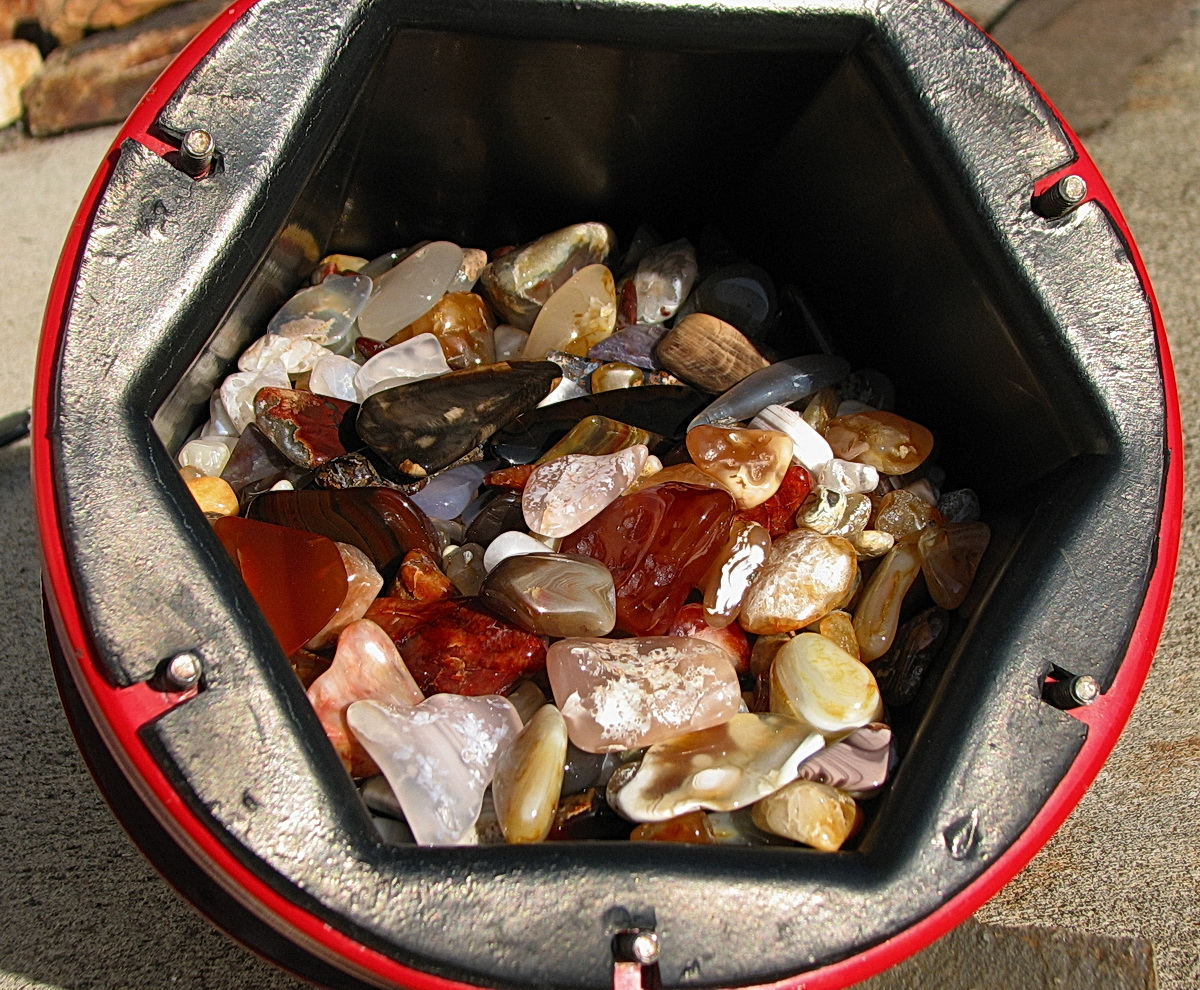
A 6.8 kg (15 lb) barrel full of tumble-polished agate and jasper

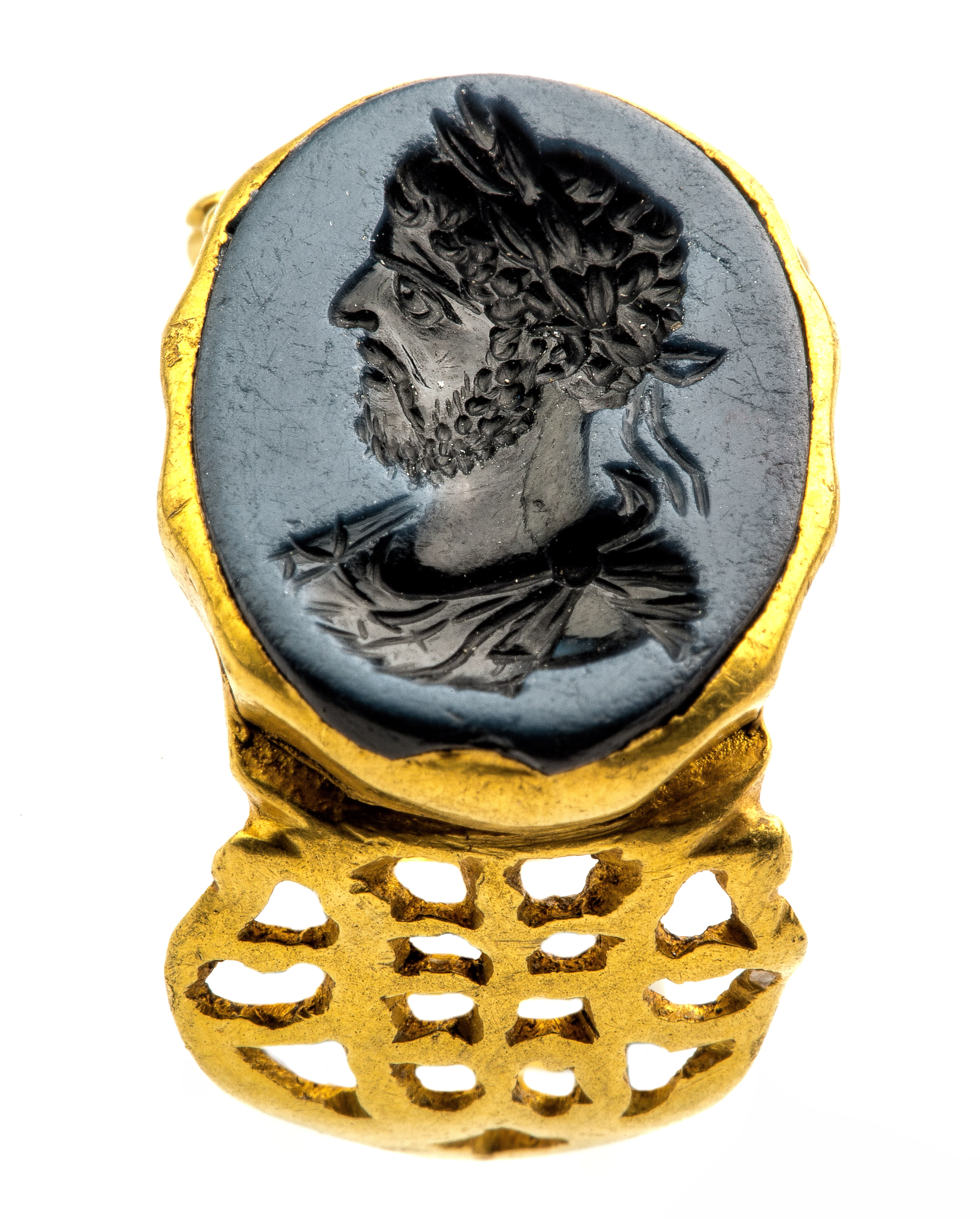
Gold Roman signet ring with portrait of emperor Commodus in niccolo agate, 180-200 CE, found in Tongeren, Gallo-Roman Museum (Tongeren)

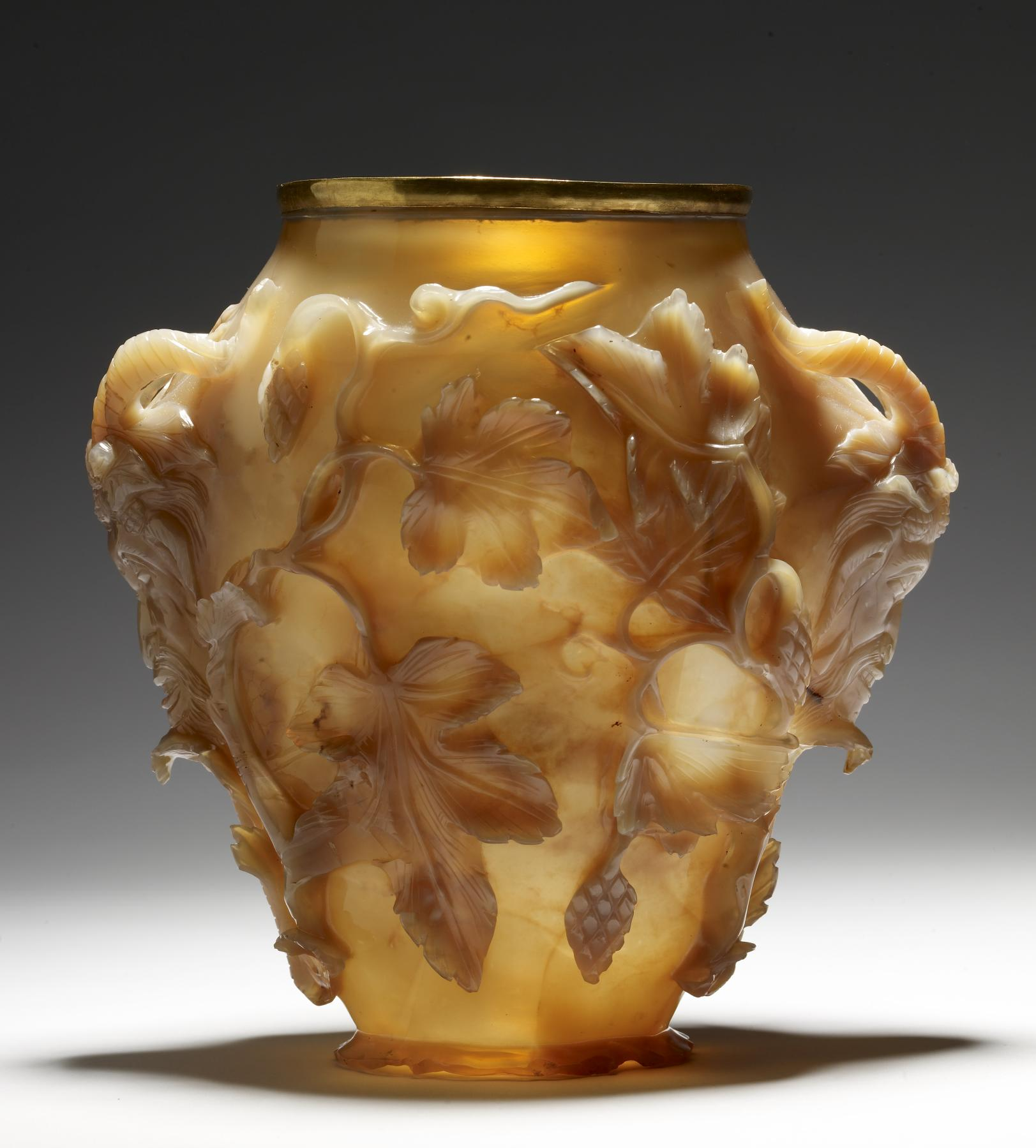
The "Rubens Vase" (Byzantine Empire). Carved in high relief from a single piece of agate, most likely created in an imperial workshop for a Byzantine emperor.

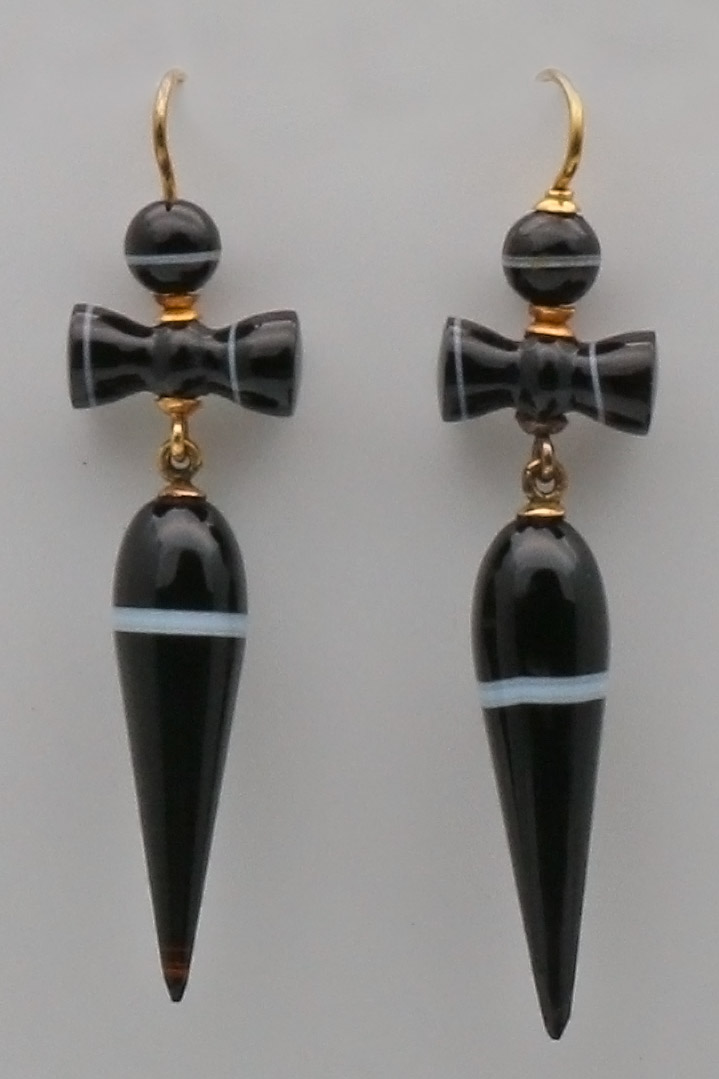
Victorian banded agate earrings

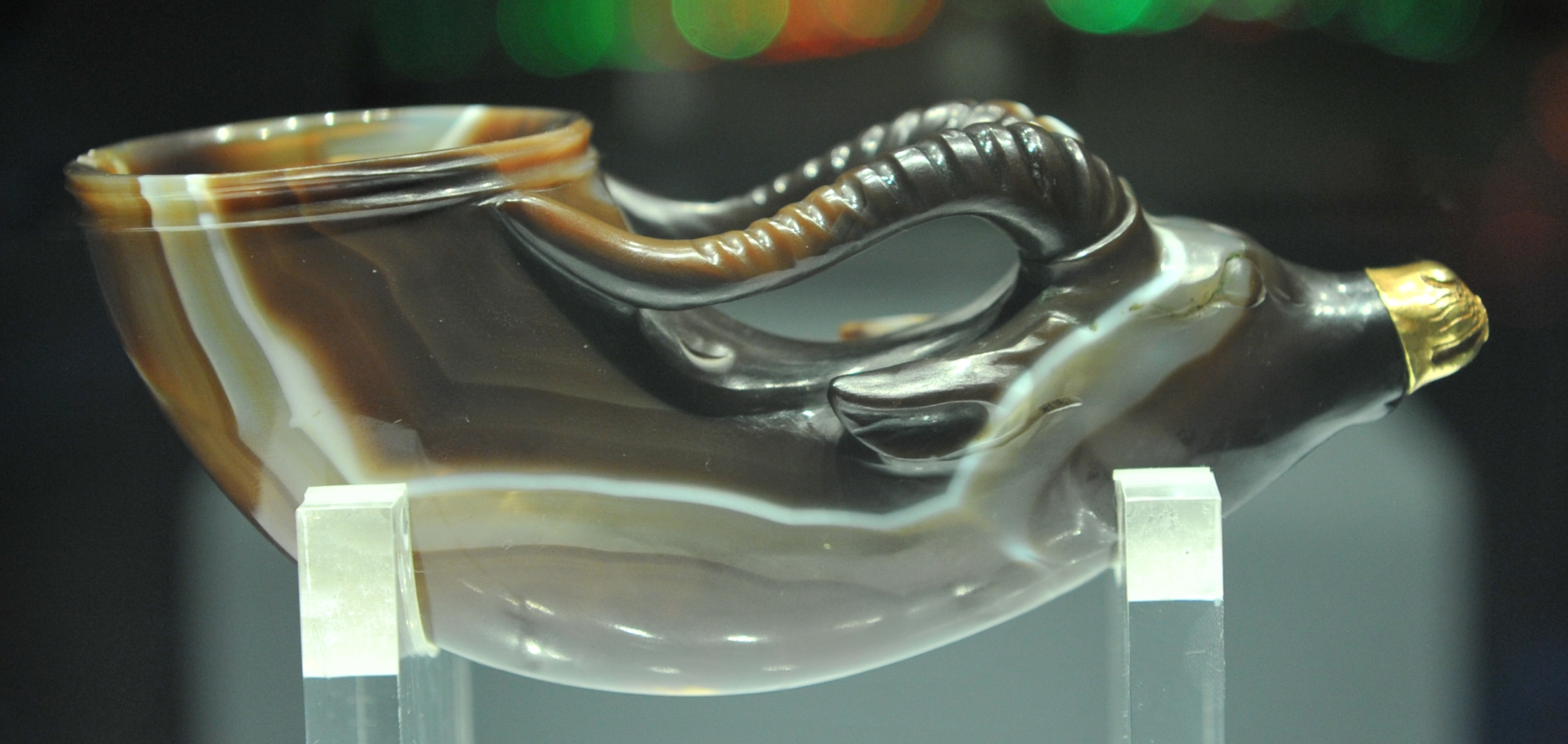
Agate drinking horn, Tang dynasty

== Treatment and processing ==
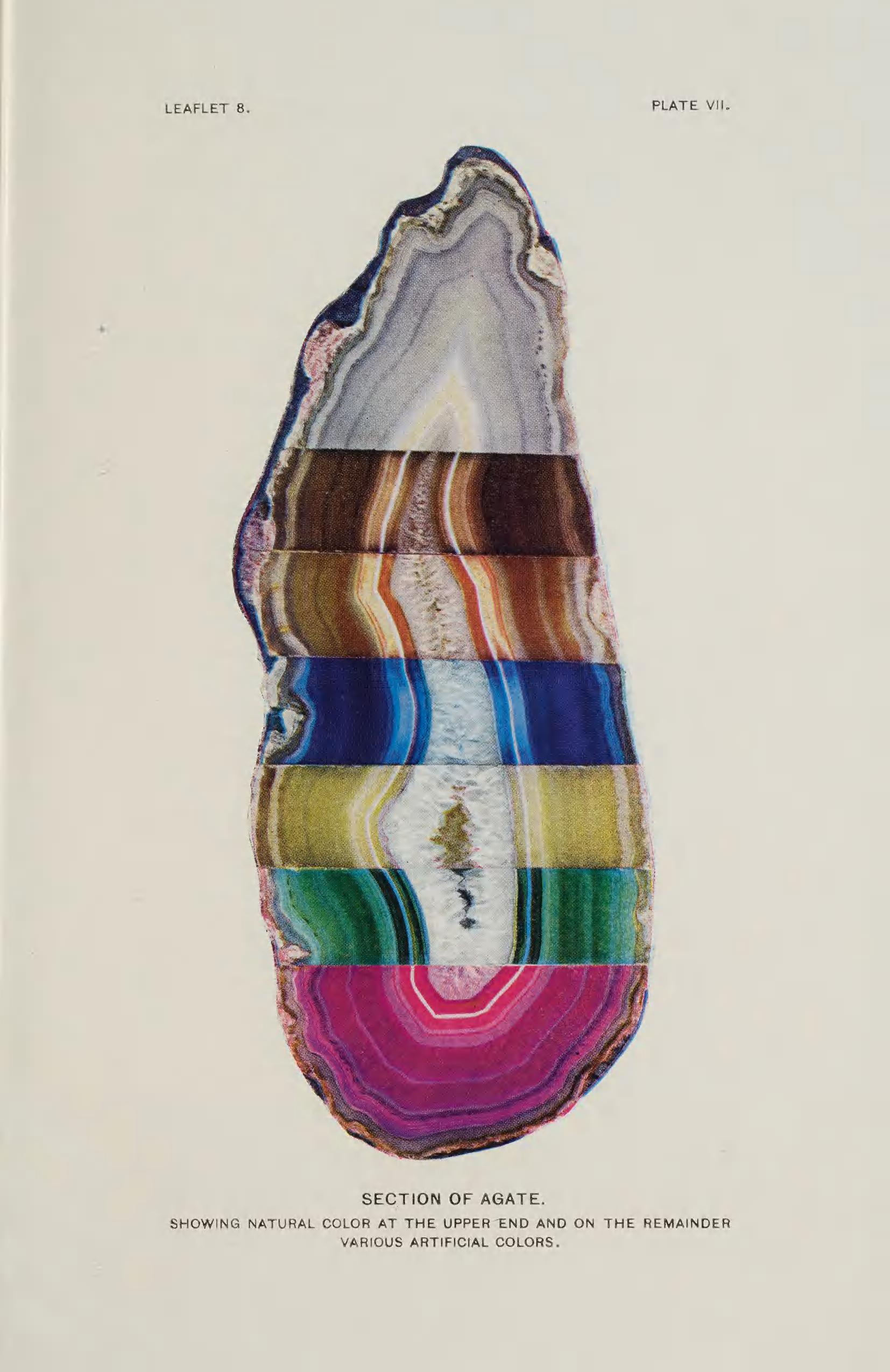
Composite image of an agate slice showing natural color at the top and various artificial colors below

Many pale or dull agates are artificially treated to enhance their colors and make them more appealing to consumers. Chalcedony is one of the earliest stones to be artificially enhanced, with heating having been used for centuries to produce the rich red color of carnelian. Many varieties of chalcedony, including agate, are relatively porous and absorb dyes well. The classical methods of staining agates were developed in the early 19th century in Idar-Oberstein, Germany. After the agates were cut and cleaned, they were soaked for several days in a particular inorganic dye or sugar solution depending on the desired color to be achieved. This was often followed by an acid bath and/or heating ("burning") to oxidize the compounds:

- Blue agates were produced by using a solution of potassium ferricyanide or ferrocyanide followed by iron sulfate, which forms iron ferricyanide (Prussian blue).
- Red agates were produced either by burning alone, or if not enough natural iron was present in the stones, by first soaking them in a solution of iron nitrate and then burning them to form iron oxide.
- Green agates were produced using solutions of nickel or chromium salts followed by burning.
- Black agates were produced by soaking the stones in a sugar solution and then immersing them in sulfuric acid to carbonize the sugars; brown agates were also produced using a similar method.
- Yellow agates were relatively unpopular. They could be produced by treating iron-stained agates with hydrochloric acid in combination with burning to reduce Fe^{3+} to Fe^{2+}.

Organic aniline dyes derived from coal tar began to be used later in the 19th century, which allowed for the production of agates of additional colors such as pink and purple. While the colors produced by the classical methods are typically permanent, the colors produced by organic dyes can fade with exposure to light or heat. Organic dyes can also only penetrate a short distance into the agate from the exposed surfaces. The practice of artificially treating agates remains popular today, and dyed Brazilian agates in particular are very common on the global market.

Larger agates are often cut into halves or slices with circular diamond saws. They can then be polished with lapidary grinding, sanding, and polishing wheels of successively greater grit sizes. Smaller agates and crushed agate fragments can alternatively be polished using rock tumblers or vibratory polishers. This equipment can generate large quantities of silica dust. Respiratory diseases such as silicosis, and a higher incidence of tuberculosis among workers involved in the agate industry, have been studied in India and China.

== See also ==
- List of minerals
