= Thunderegg =

Nodule-like rock, that is formed within rhyolitic volcanic ash layers

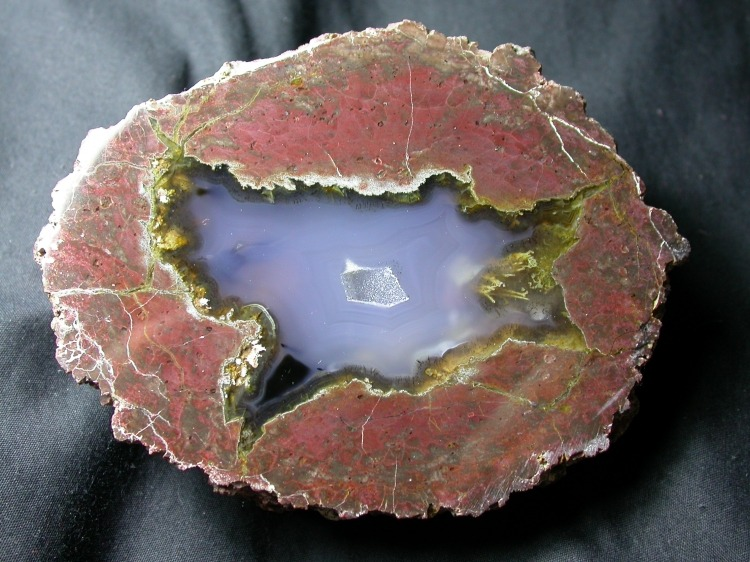
A thunderegg from the Black Rock Desert in Nevada that has been cut in half

A thunderegg (or thunder egg) is a nodule-like rock, similar to a filled geode, that is formed within rhyolitic volcanic ash layers. Thundereggs are rough spheres, most about the size of a baseball—though they can range from a little more than a centimeter (one half inch) to over a meter (three feet) across. They usually contain centres of chalcedony which may have been fractured followed by deposition of agate, jasper or opal, either uniquely or in combination. Also frequently encountered are quartz and gypsum crystals, as well as various other mineral growths and inclusions. Thundereggs usually look like ordinary rocks on the outside, but slicing them in half and polishing them may reveal intricate patterns and colours. A characteristic feature of thundereggs is that (like other agates) the individual beds they come from can vary in appearance, though they can maintain a certain specific identity within them.

Thunderegg is not synonymous with either geode or agate. A geode is a simple term for a rock with a hollow in it, often with crystal formation/growth. A thunderegg on the other hand is a specific geological structure. A thunderegg may be referred to as a geode if it has a hollow in it, but not all geodes are thundereggs because there are many different ways for a hollow to form. Similarly, a thunderegg is just one of the forms that agate can assume.

== Occurrence ==
Thundereggs are found globally where conditions are optimal. In the United States, Oregon is one of the most famous thunderegg locations. Germany is also an important center for thunderegg agates (especially sites like St Egidien and Gehlberg).

Other places known for thundereggs include Ethiopia, Poland, Romania, Turkey, Mexico, Argentina, Canada, Australia (where they are primarily located the Scenic Rim, including Mount Tamborine, and Murwillumbah in New South Wales), and France (in the Esterel massif ).

== Formation ==
Thundereggs are found in flows of rhyolite lava. They form in the lava from the action of water percolating through the porous rock carrying silica in solution. The deposits lined and filled the cavity, first with a darker matrix material, then an inner core of agate or chalcedony. The various colors come from differences in the minerals found in the soil and rock that the water has moved through.

== State rock designation ==
After an initiative by the Springfield Thunderegg Rock Club, on March 29, 1965, the thunderegg was designated as the Oregon state rock by a joint resolution of the Oregon Legislative Assembly. While thundereggs can be collected all over Oregon, the largest deposits are found in Crook, Jefferson, Malheur, Wasco and Wheeler counties. The world's largest thunderegg, a 1.75 ton specimen, is housed by the Rice Northwest Museum of Rocks and Minerals in Hillsboro, Oregon.

== Legend ==
Native American legend reportedly considers the rocks to be the eggs of the thunderbirds which occupied Mount Hood and Mount Jefferson. Thunder Spirits on the mountains hurled the "eggs" at each other.

== Images ==
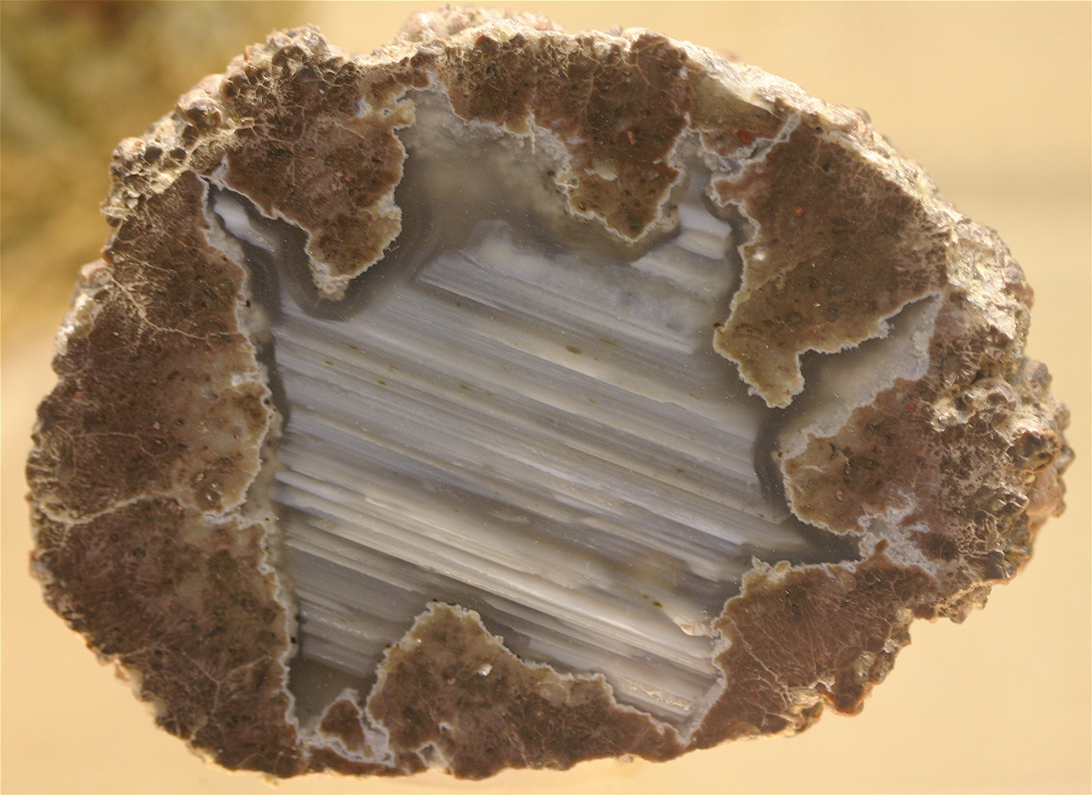
A thunderegg from Succor Creek on display at the Oregon State Capitol

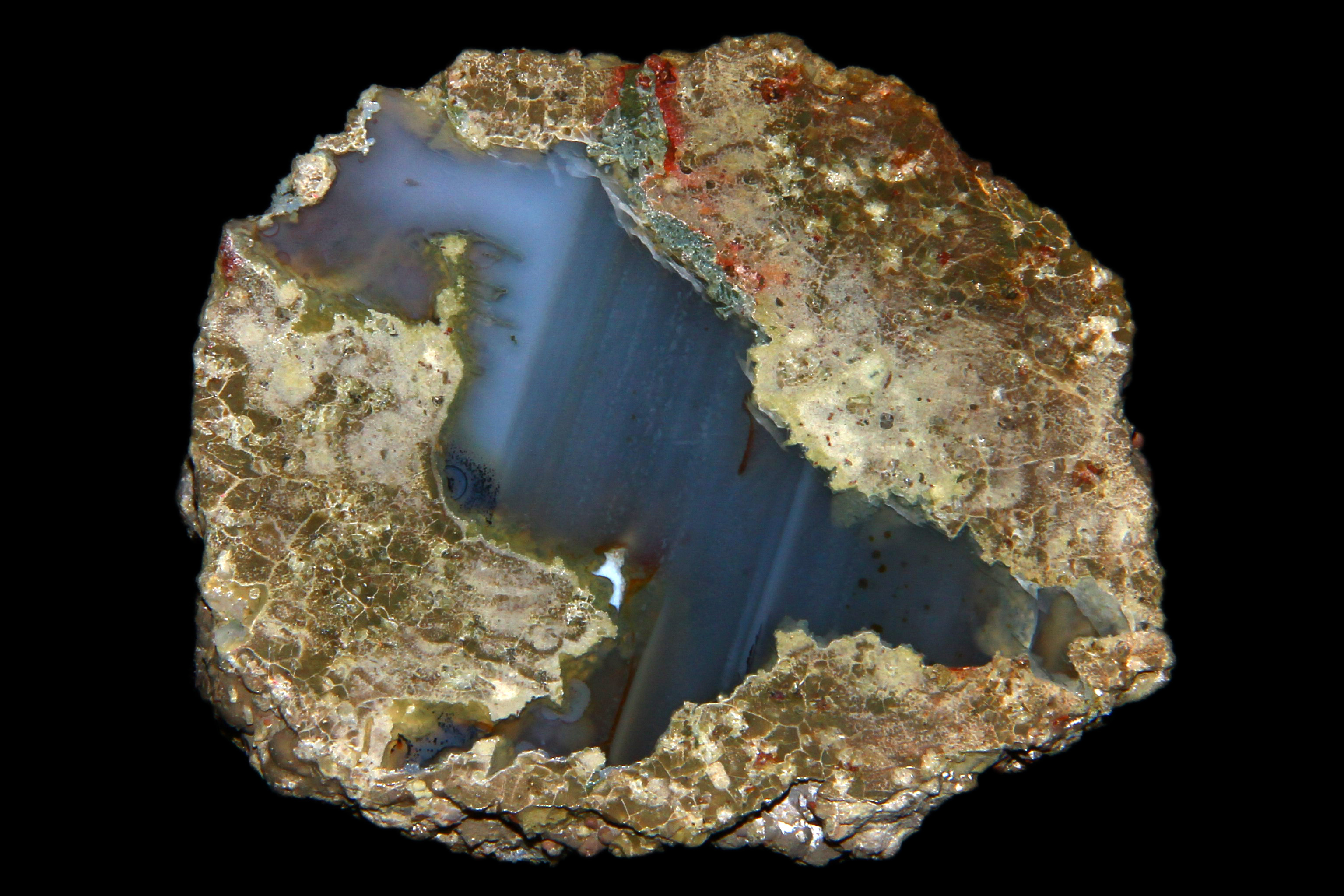
A thunderegg agate from Falen Tree, Oregon, US

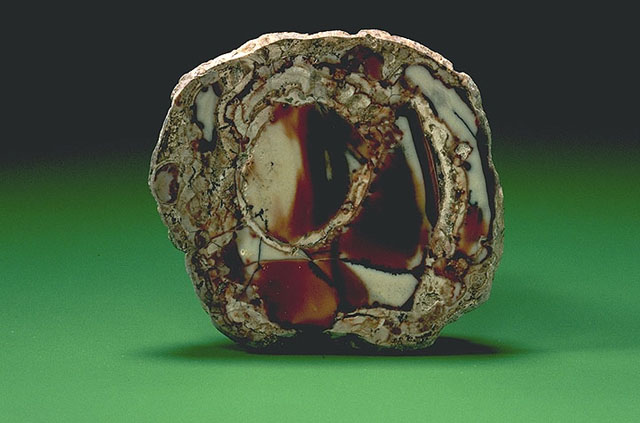
A jasper thunderegg from White Fir Springs, Oregon

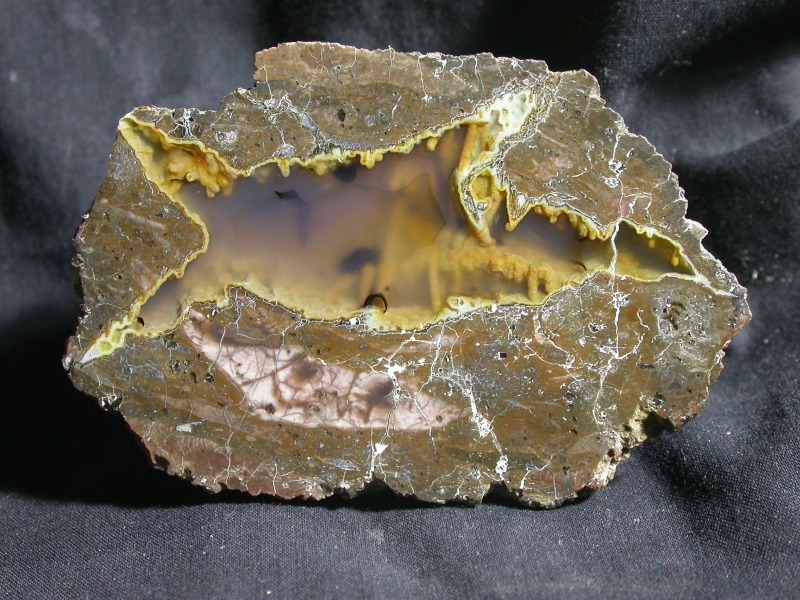
A Friend Ranch thunderegg from Oregon

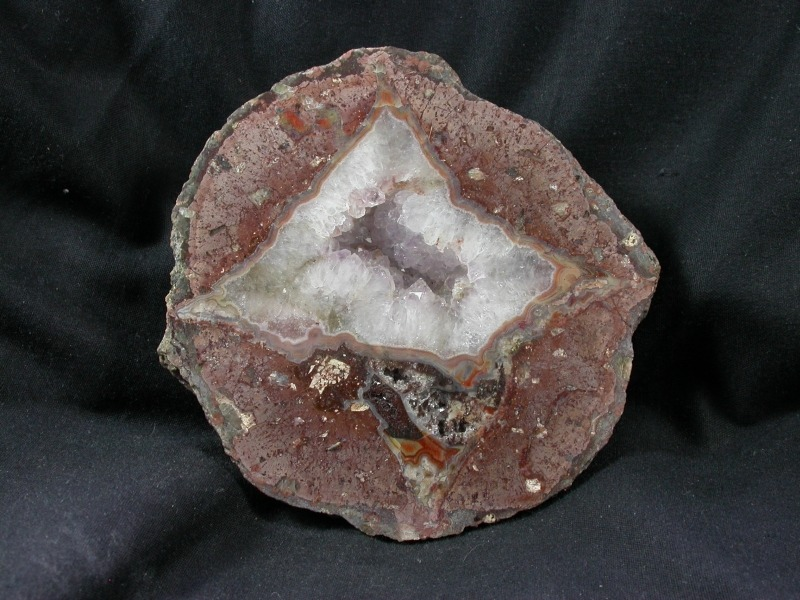
A thunderegg geode from Gehlberg, Germany

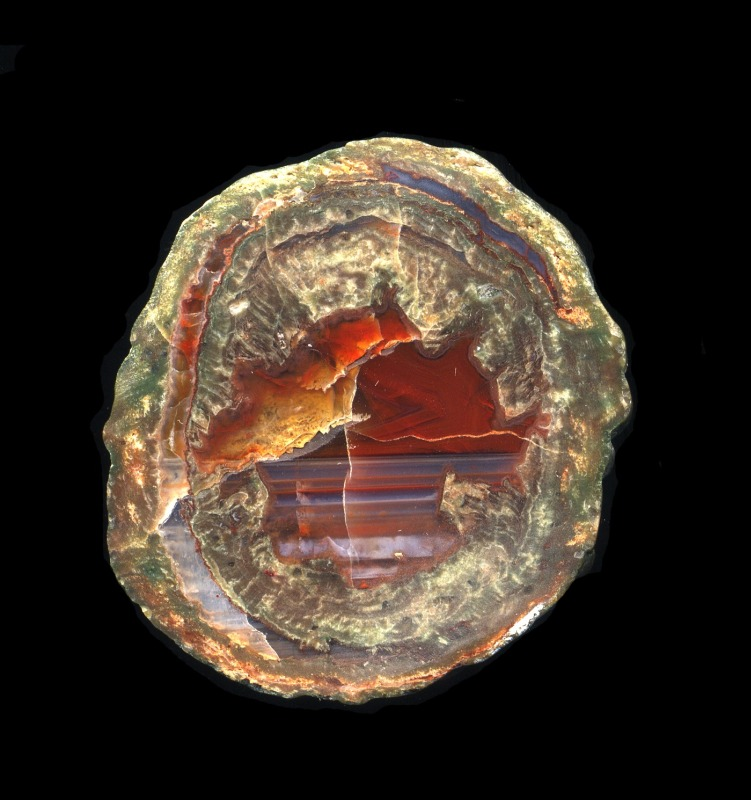
A thunderegg agate from the south of France

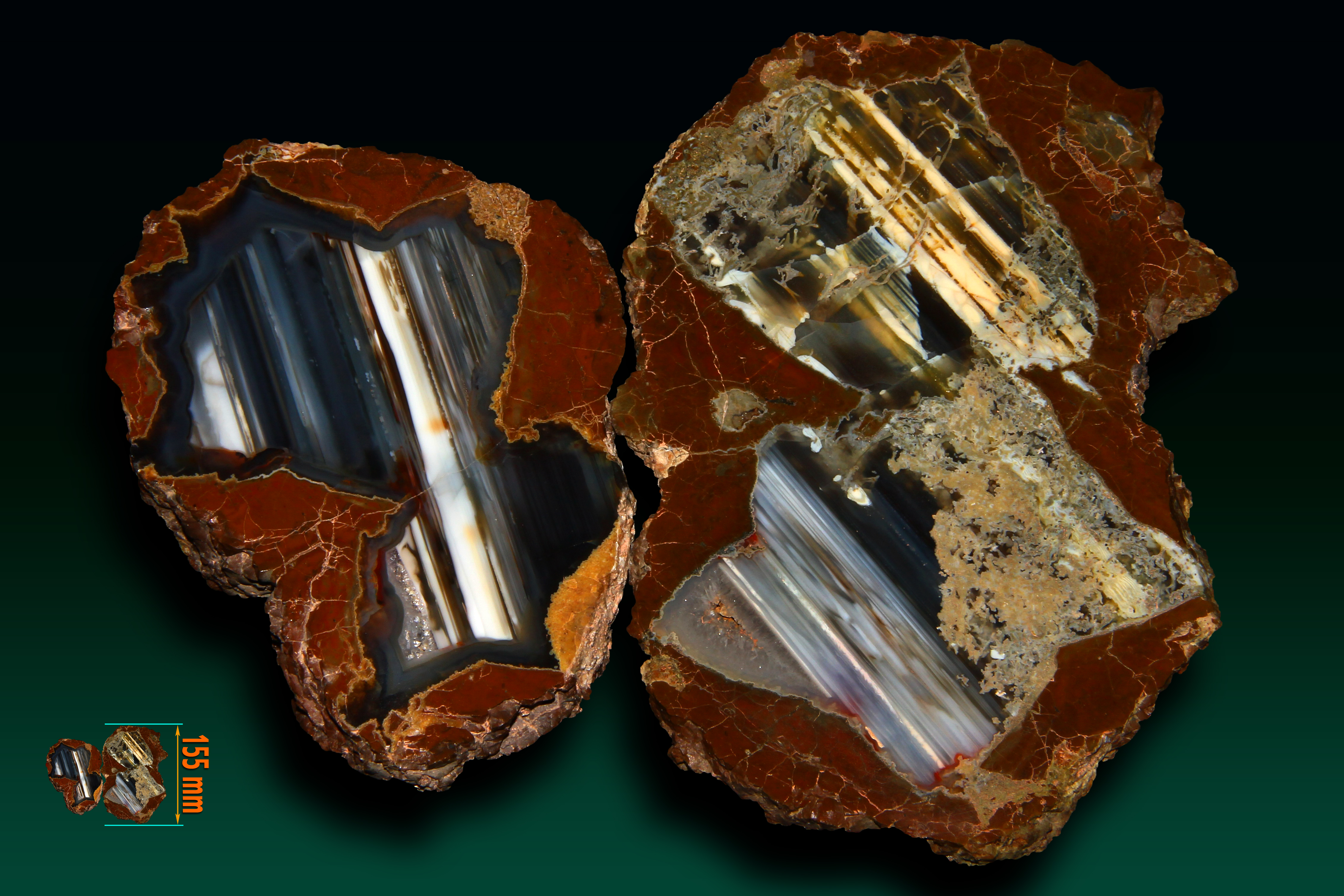
Two double thundereggs from Richardson Ranch (was known as Priday Ranch), Madras, Oregon

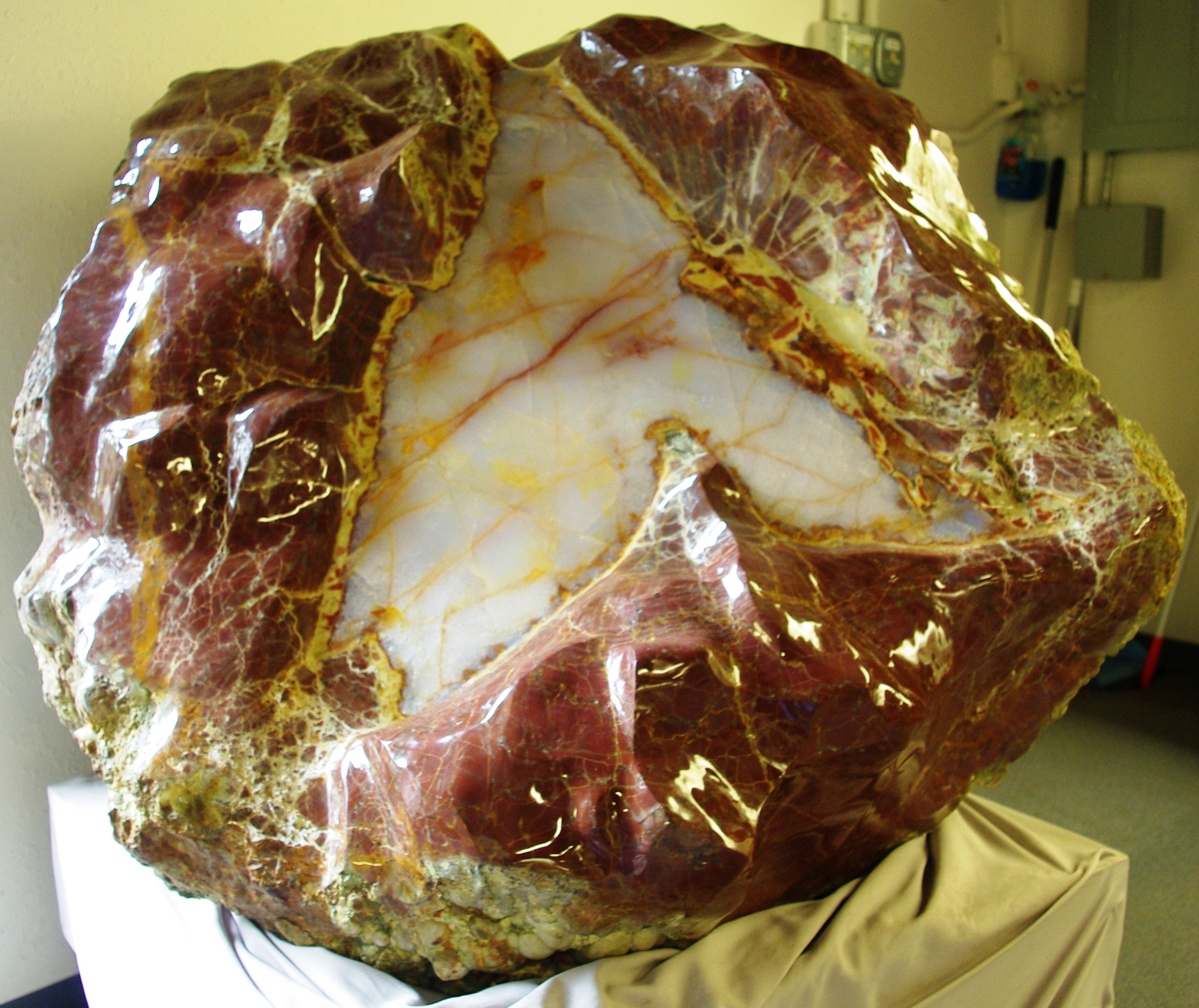
Largest opal-filled thunderegg in the world, from Opal Butte in Oregon

== See also ==
- Lithophysa
