= Enhydro agate =

Geode with trapped water

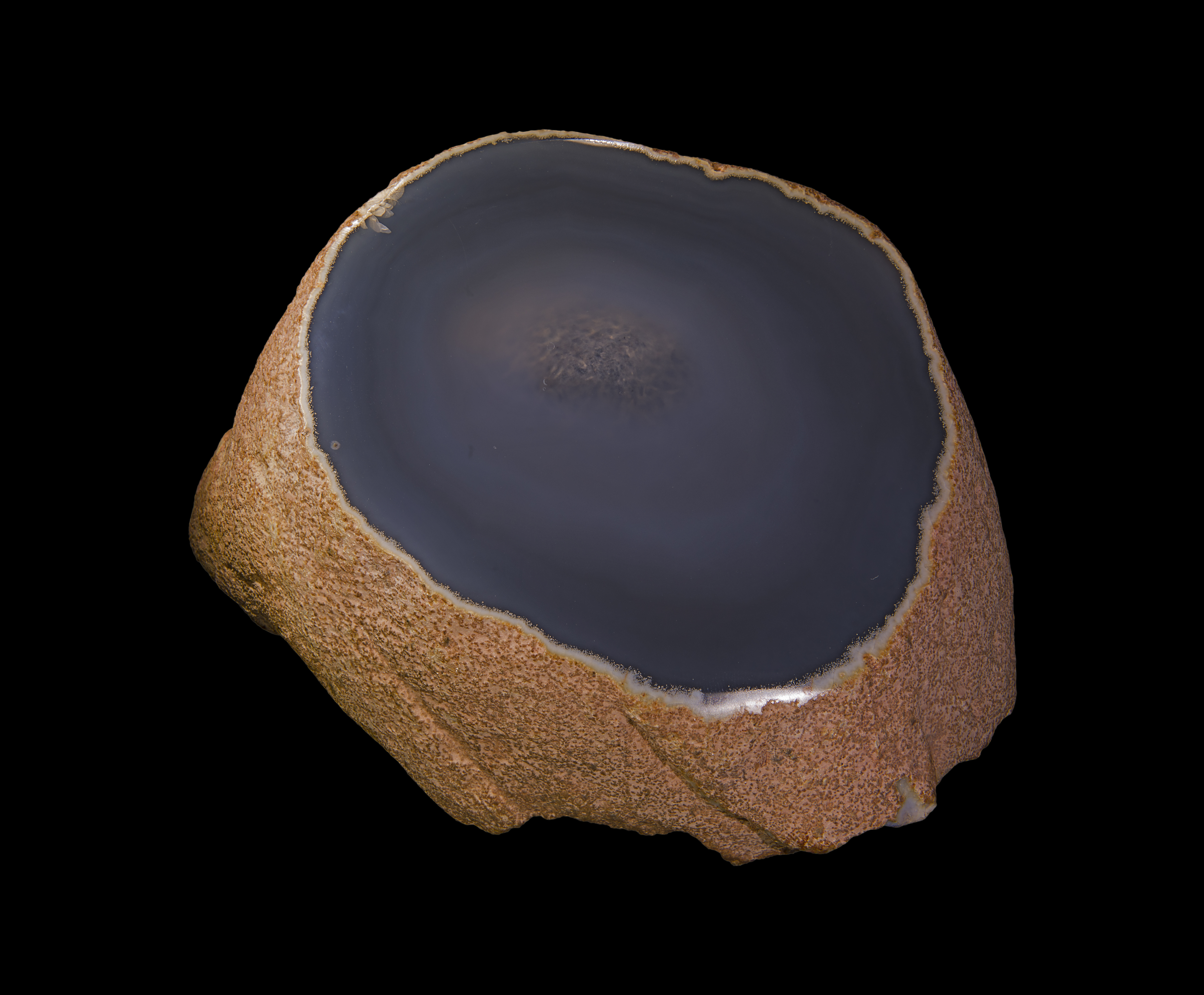
Enhydro geode, found in Brazil.

Enhydro agates are nodules, agates, or geodes with water trapped inside its cavity. Enhydros are closely related to fluid inclusions, but are composed of chalcedony. The formation of enhydros is still an ongoing process, with specimens dated back to the Eocene Epoch. They are commonly found in areas with volcanic rock.

== Description ==
Enhydro agates are made up of banded microcrystalline or cryptocrystalline quartz. The agate has a hollow center, partially containing water. Enhydro agates can also contain debris or petroleum. Because the cavity is not full, the agate can produce sound from being shaken. Agates vary in size. The largest recorded agate was found in Fuxin City, China, with a diameter of 63 cm (24.8 in) and weighing 310 kg (683 lbs).

== Formation ==
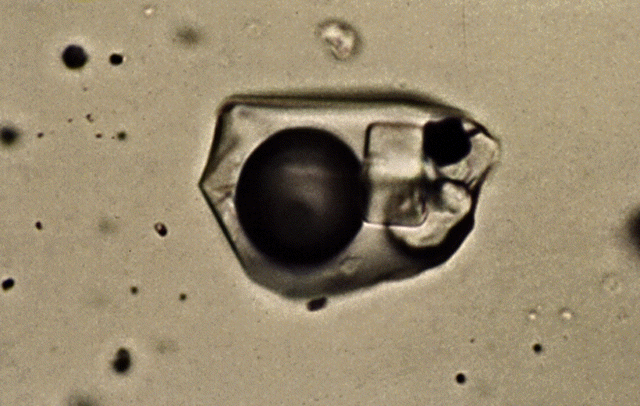
A microscopic picture of a fluid inclusion (non-permeable enhydro) showing a dark vapor bubble trapped in quartz.

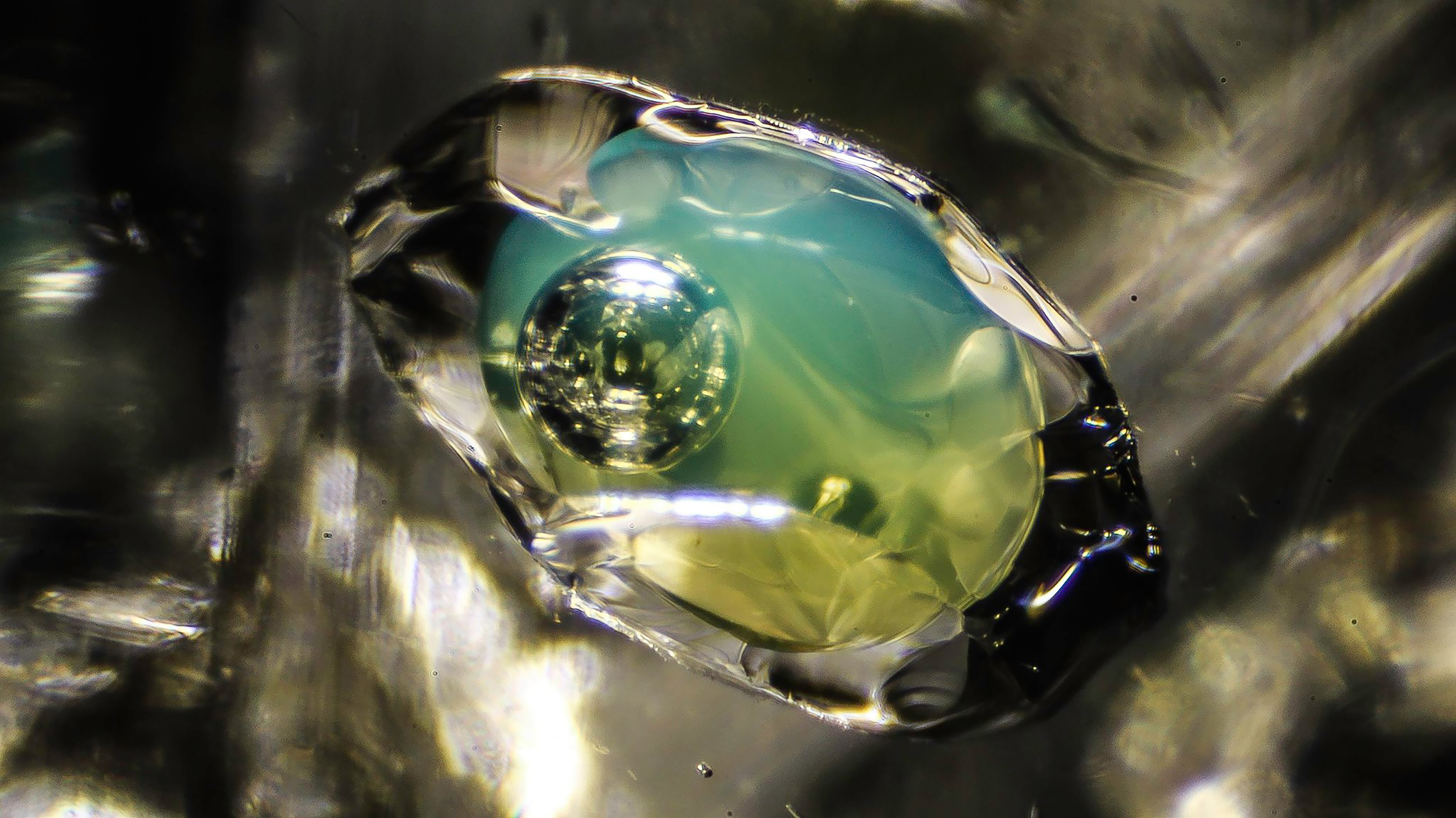
The term three phase relates to the three phases of matter, solid, liquid, and gas. This is a three phase inclusion in rock crystal quartz. The solid is a black material that is of bituminous origin. The liquid encased is petroleum, and the gas bubble is methane.

Enhydros are formed when water rich in silica percolates through volcanic rock, forming layers of deposited mineral. As layers build up, the mineral forms a cavity in which the water becomes trapped. The cavity is then layered with the silica-rich water, forming its shell. Unlike fluid inclusions, the chalcedony shell is permeable, allowing water to enter and exit the cavity very slowly. The water inside of an enhydro agate is most times not the same water as when the formation occurred. During the formation of an enhydro agate, debris can get trapped in the cavity. Types of debris varies in every agate.
