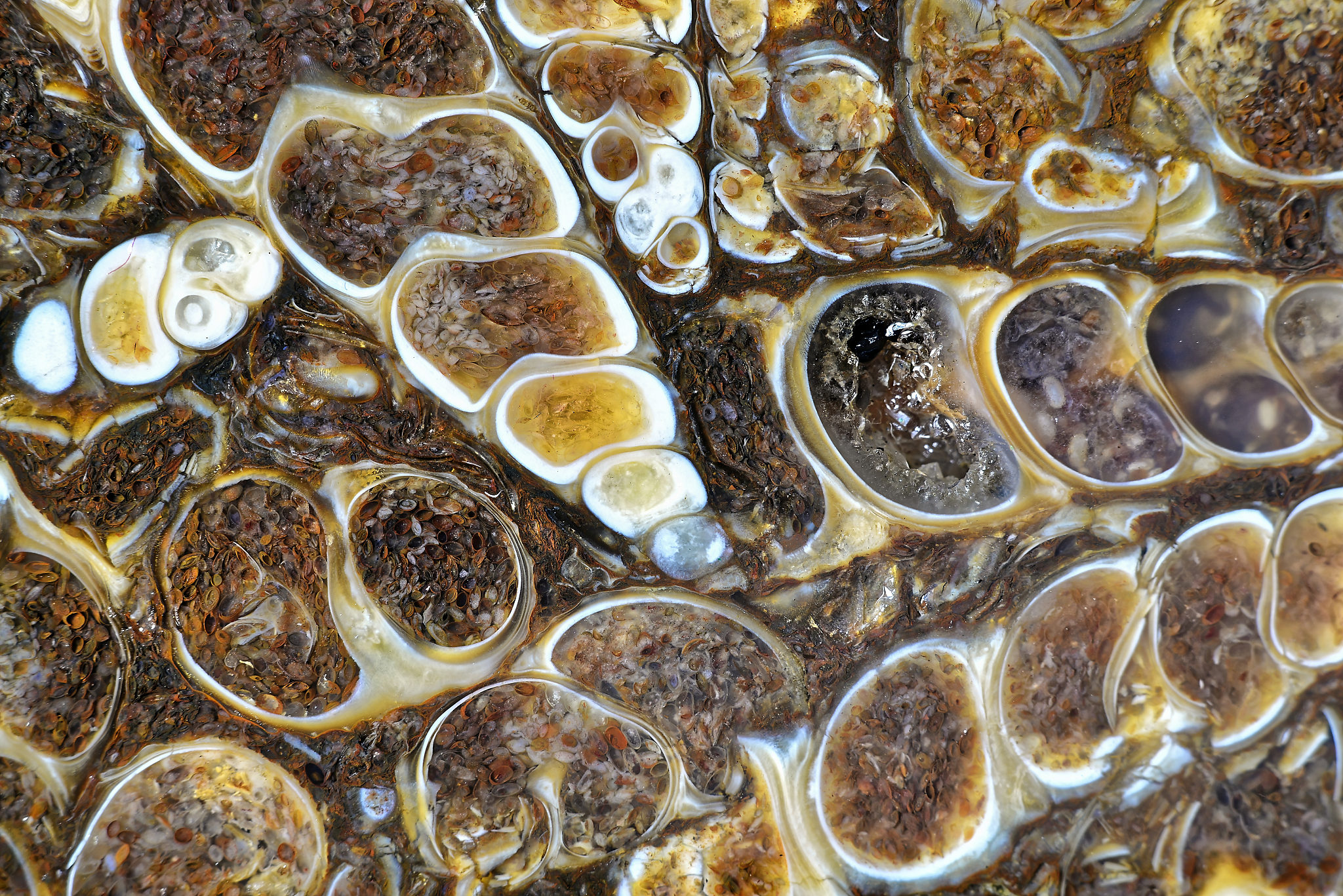
- Elimia tenera shells with ostracod shells

Scientific classification
- Kingdom: Animalia
- Phylum: Mollusca
- Class: Gastropoda
- Subclass: Caenogastropoda
- Family: Pleuroceridae
- Genus: Elimia
- Species: †E. tenera

Binomial name
- †Elimia tenera (Hall, 1845)

= Elimia tenera =

Elimia tenera Temporal range: Early to Middle Eocene, 51–46 Ma

Eocene species of gastropod

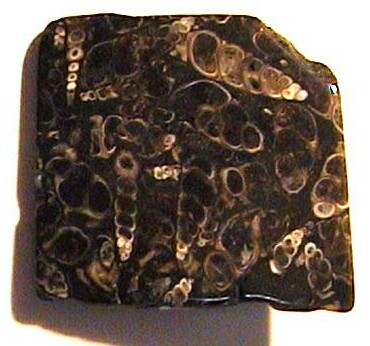
Elimia tenera in chalcedony from Wyoming

Elimia tenera, formerly known as Goniobasis tenera, is an extinct species of freshwater snail with an operculum, in the aquatic gastropod mollusk family Pleuroceridae. This species flourished during the Eocene and is now known only from the fossil record. The genus name Elimia was restored to this species in 1975; formerly it was placed in Goniobasis.

Fossilized Elimia tenera shells occur in a region which is now southern Wyoming, northern Colorado and northeastern Utah. The best preserved Elimia tenera are from Lake Gosiute which fossils occur in the Fort Laclede Bed of the Laney Member at outcrops in Sweetwater County, in southwestern Wyoming.

== Paleoecology and paleogeology ==
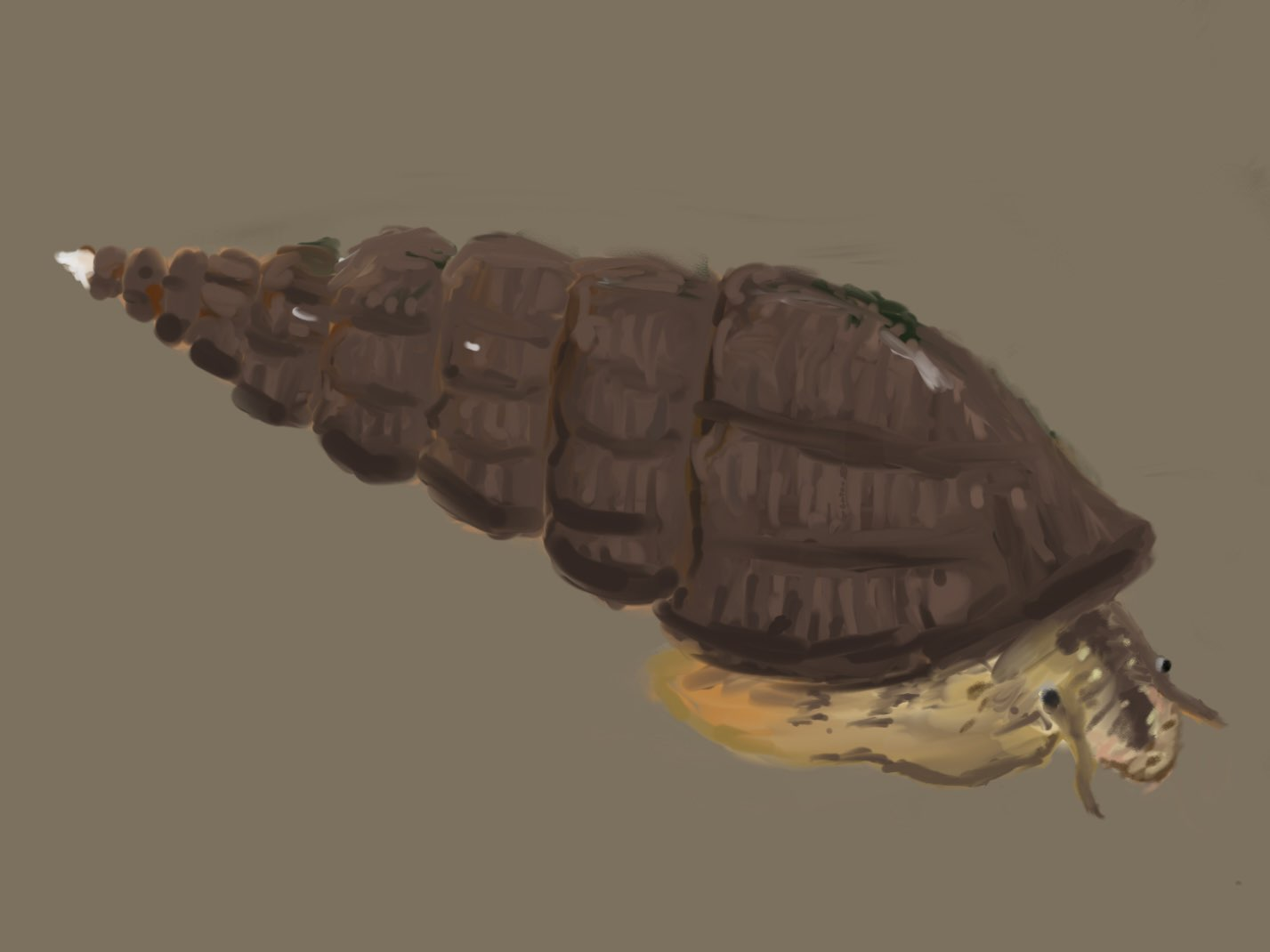
Life restoration of E. tenera

E. tenera occurs in fossil beds that are 46 to 51 million years old, in the Laney Member of the Green River Formation. Evidence suggests that the Elimia tenera were deposited nearshore in a series of shallow lakes, which geologists have named the Fossil, Uinta and Gosiute Lakes. The climate was subtropical and there were intermittent volcanic eruptions.

=== 'Turritella agate' ===
Fossil shells of E. tenera are hosted in chalcedony-rich sedimentary rock. This rock was originally incorrectly called Turritella agate. It was named after the sea snail genus Turritella because of the resemblance of the freshwater snail shells to the Turritella fossils that are found in agate in Texas and California. The Wyoming fossil shells, however, are in a freshwater sedimentary deposit and identifiable as the genus Elimia, and are less-silicified than those in Texas and California.
