= Hermosa Masonic Lodge =

- U.S. National Register of Historic Places
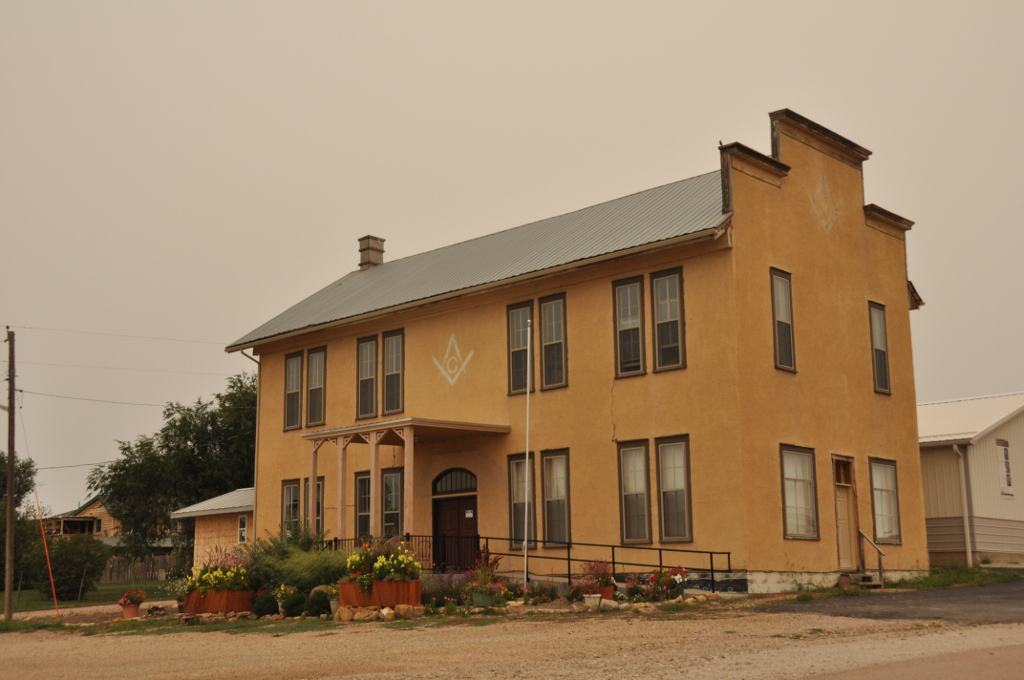

- Location within South Dakota Location within the United States
- Location: W. side of 2nd St., between Folsom St. and Hwy 40, Hermosa, South Dakota
- Coordinates: 43°50′31″N 103°11′29″W
- Area: less than one acre
- Built: 1889
- Architectural style: Gable end false front
- NRHP reference No.: 09000043
- Added to NRHP: February 17, 2009

Hermosa Masonic Lodge is an historic Masonic building located in Hermosa, South Dakota, United States. In 1926 Battle River Lodge No. 92 of Hermosa bought the 1889 Hermosa School, stripped it of its brick veneer, belfry and end gable and moved it to what is now 33 North 2nd Street where the remaining wooden shell was converted into a lodge hall. The exterior walls were stuccoed and a false front was added.

Lincoln Borglum, who became the first superintendent of Mount Rushmore after the death of his father in 1941, was a member of Battle River Masonic Lodge No. 92.

The building was listed on the National Register of Historic Places in 2009. This building is no longer owned by the Masonic Lodge, but now by the Hermosa Arts and History Association, which helps preserve the community's history and culture.
