= June Culp Zeitner =

American writer

- Born: Vivian June Culp; February 7, 1916; Michigan, U.S.
- Died: October 11, 2009 (aged 93); Rapid City, South Dakota, U.S.
- Education: Northern State University
- Occupations: Writer, mineral and gem collector
- Spouse: Albert Zeitner

Vivian June Culp Zeitner (February 7, 1916 – October 11, 2009) was an American non-fiction writer who authored a dozen books and over a thousand articles about gemstones. She was nicknamed "The First Lady of Gems", and was the namesake of the June Culp Zeitner Emerald, the largest emerald found and cut in the United States.

== Early life and education ==
Culp was born on February 7, 1916, in northern Michigan, the eldest of five daughters born to Vernon Culp and Pearl Culp. The Culp family moved to Tripp, South Dakota, by 1920, and to Aberdeen, South Dakota, by 1930. She graduated from Northern State University.

== Career ==
Zeitner began her career as an artist in Minneapolis, and as an English teacher in Mission, South Dakota. She began hunting for special rocks and gems with her husband; the two drove all over the United States in their pursuit of minerals. Over the course of her career, she authored a dozen books and over a thousand articles about gemstones. She was also an editor at Lapidary Journal for three decades. She was nicknamed "the First Lady of Gems" in 1976, at a White House ceremony marking the 25th anniversary of the American Federation of Mineralogical Societies. She founded the National Rockhound and Lapidary Hall of Fame in Murdo, South Dakota. In 2005 she received the Carnegie Mineralogical Award. She founded the State Stone Program, to support local mineralogical societies to work for a state gem, fossil and stone in each state. She was named South Dakota Woman of Achievement in 1976, and received the 1985 A. H. Pankow Award as an outstanding South Dakota journalist. She lived in Rapid City, South Dakota, from 1986 to 2009.

== Publications ==
- "Frosty Morning" (1942, poem)
- "In Reply" (1943, poem)
- Midwest Gem Trails (1955)
- Appalachian Mineral and Gem Trails (1968)
- Southwest Mineral and Gem Trails (1972)
- "Facts About Fairburns" (1973)
- Borglum's Unfinished Dream: Mount Rushmore (1976, with Lincoln Borglum)
- "Colorful Chalcedony in America" (1977)
- "Precious Opal in the United States" (1986)
- How to Carve Jade and Gems (1987)
- Gem and Lapidary Materials (1996)
- Geodes: Nature's Treasures (2006, with Brad L. Cross)

== Personal life and legacy ==
Culp married C. Albert Zeitner in 1941. Her husband died in 1995, and she died on October 11, 2009, in Rapid City, at the age of 93. A tribute to Zeitner was read on the floor of the United States Senate in November 2009, by John Thune. The June Culp Zeitner Emerald, the largest emerald found and cut in the United States, is named in her honor.
