= Fairburn agate =

Variety of fortification banded agate from South Dakota and Nebraska

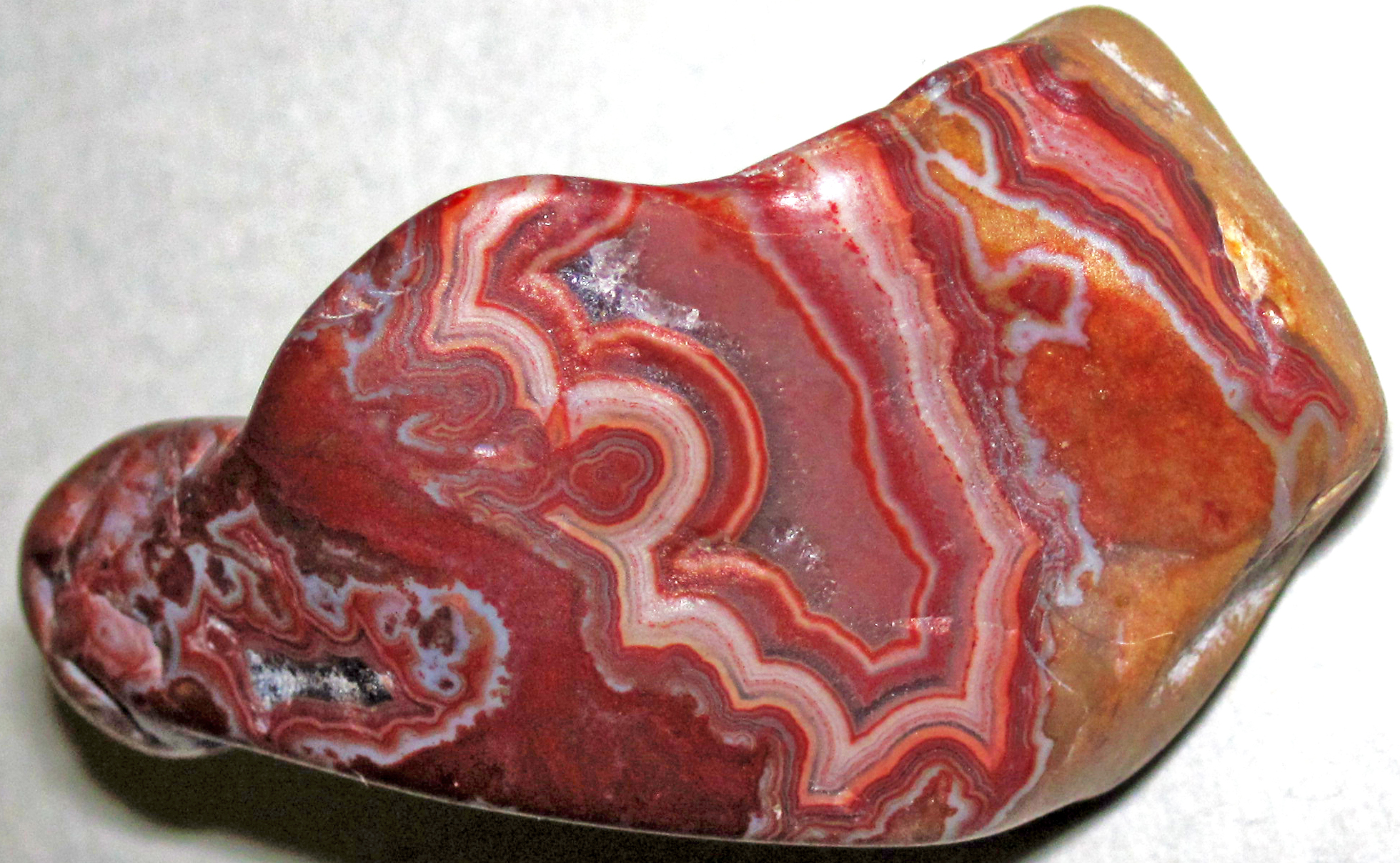
- Fairburn agate showing the fortification matrix

General
- Category: Tectosilicate minerals
- Group: Quartz group
- Formula: SiO_{2} (silica)
- IMA status: Variety of quartz (chalcedony)

Identification
- Color: brown, red, orange, blue, yellow, black, and white banded
- Crystal habit: Cryptocrystalline silica
- Mohs scale hardness: 6.5–7
- Luster: Waxy

Fairburn agate is a variety of agate found in southwestern South Dakota and northwestern Nebraska. It is named after the town of Fairburn in South Dakota, where it is also the state gemstone. Fairburns are characterized from other types of agate by their colors and the shape of the bands.

== Distinction ==
Fairburns, like other types of agate, are composed of concentric layers of cryptocrystalline chalcedony colorized by different trace minerals. However, fortification banding distinguishes Fairburns from other agate types. Fortification banding means that the concentric layers have sharp changes in direction which cause the bands to form angles in ways which are especially distinguishable from other agate types. Mainly, no other agate type forms these patterns.

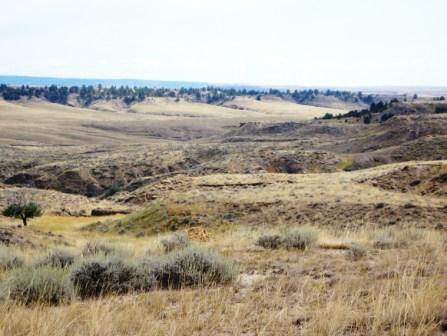
Buffalo Gap National Grasslands, the location of the Fairburn agate beds

== Formation ==
The genesis of Fairburn agates is debated and not fully understood; however, two theories are most accepted.

=== Theory 1 ===
Fairburn formation takes place in sedimentary limestone, where calcite inside the limestone is replaced by silicon-dioxide or silicic acid over time in a high-pressure, microporous environment. In this theory, bands of agate form from the inside of the agate outwards.

=== Theory 2 ===
The agates are created by heat and pressure filling cavities in igneous rock with layers of silica, over time. The first layer of silica lines the inside of the cavity and crystallizes. Then, during another geologic event, a different set of minerals and silica form on top of these layers, essentially forming the layers from the outside in, explaining why some agates have cavities in the center. These agates are incomplete and have not been fully filled with silica.

=== Widely accepted facts ===
Colors found in the bands are created by trace amounts of minerals such as iron oxide, hematite, goethite, magnetite, and other oxidated minerals. These materials mixed with the silica and were included in the crystallization during formation, giving the layers of cryptocrystalline quartz their color.

=== Formation location ===
It is suspected that Fairburn agates originated in or near the Black Hills of Eastern Wyoming and Western South Dakota, were exposed due to erosion, and were carried into agate beds downstream. It is also possible they formed at the site where they lie and were washed free of dirt and limestone debris by wind and weather. However, the former is more plausible than the latter.

== Cultural significance ==
Fairburns, as well as other types of agates, are collected by geologists and other interested individuals for pleasure or use in jewelry or lapidary artwork. Yearly conventions are held in places such as Crawford, Nebraska, for collectors to exchange rocks and socialize with other collectors. Often during erosion, agates were broken in half. These festivals and conventions give collectors a chance to find the missing half of an agate they found.

The Fairburn was designated as the state gemstone of South Dakota as of February 11, 1966, due to its prominence in the region and cultural impact with regard to collecting and decoration.
