= Iron nitrate =

Iron nitrate may refer to:

- Iron(II) nitrate, Fe(NO_{3})_{2}, a green compound that is unstable to heat
- Iron(III) nitrate (or ferric nitrate), Fe(NO_{3})_{3}, a pale violet compound that has a low melting point
