= Gemstones in the Bible =

A range of gemstones are mentioned in the Bible, particularly in the Old Testament and the Book of Revelation. Much has been written about the precise identification of these stones, which has ranged from speculative to increasingly scientific with the advent of archeogemology.

== History ==
The Israelites obtained gemstones from across the known world, from Egypt and the African continent broadly to the Baltic Sea in Europe as far as Badakhshan in Afghanistan. At the time of the Exodus, the Bible states that the Israelites took gemstones with them from Egypt (Book of Exodus, 3:22; 12:35–6). When they were settled in the Land of Israel, they obtained gemstones from the merchant caravans traveling from Babylonia or Persia to Egypt, and those from Saba and Raamah to Tyre (Book of Ezekiel, 27:22). King Solomon even equipped a fleet which returned from Ophir, laden with gems (Books of Kings, 10:11).

Gemstones are mentioned in connection with the breastplate of the High Priest of Israel (Book of Exodus, 38:17–20; 39:10–13), the treasure of the King of Tyre (Book of Ezekiel, 28:13), and the foundations of the New Jerusalem (Book of Tobit, 13:16–7, in the Greek text, and more fully, Book of Revelation, 21:18–21). Both Book of Ezekiel 28:13 and Book of Revelation, 21:18–21 are patterned after the model of the priestly breastplate and further allude to the Twelve Tribes of Israel.

At the time of the Septuagint translation, the stones to which the Hebrew names apply could no longer be identified, and translators used various Greek words to translate the same Hebrew word. The ancients did not classify gemstones by analyzing their composition or crystalline shapes: names were given in accordance with appearance (color, luster), use, or provenance. Therefore, stones of the same or nearly the same color, but of different composition or crystalline form, may bear identical names. Another problem is nomenclature; names having changed in the course of time: thus the ancient chrysolite is peridot, sapphire is lapis lazuli, etc.

== Alphabetical list ==
The list comprises the Hebrew, Greek, and Latin names for each stone, referential locations, etymology, descriptions, and historical source for each stone in the Bible. Note that the Hebrew term does not always correspond perfectly to Greek or Latin, certainly not to English. Because of the frequency of mistranslation, the Greek and Latin translations of the Hebrew Bible have been largely omitted.

=== Agate ===
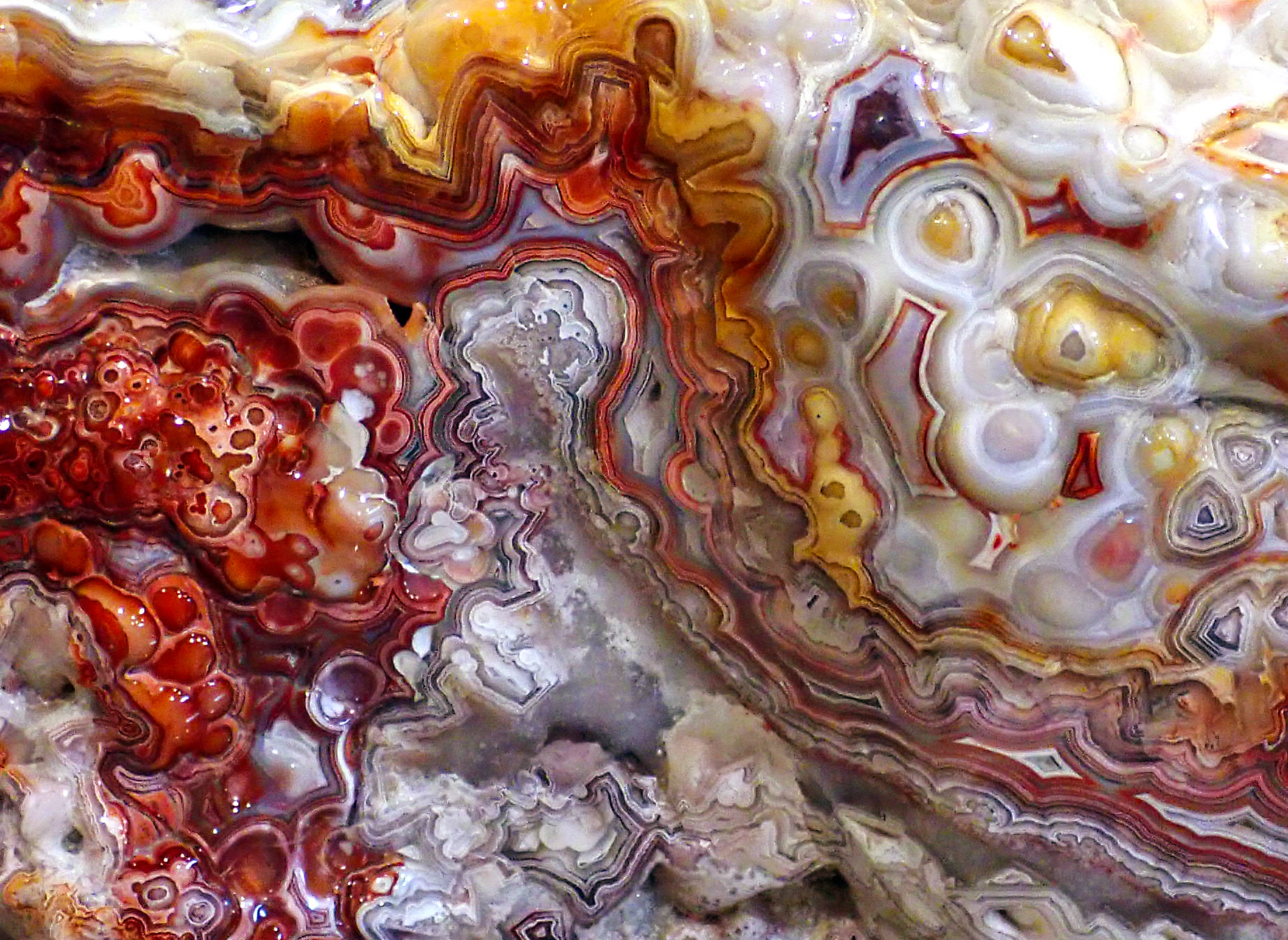
Mexican crazy lace agate

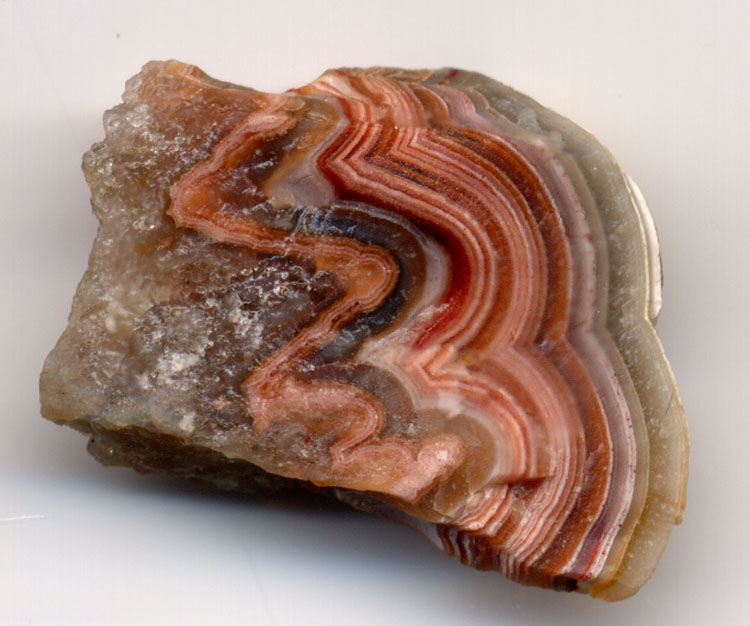
Agate

Agate - Hebrew שְׁבוֹ šəḇō; Greek ἀχάτης achates, Latin achates (Exodus 28:19, 39:12, in Heb. and Vulgate; also Ezekiel 28:13 in Septuagint).

This is the second stone of the third row of the priestly breastplate, where it likely represented the tribe of Asher. Hebrew šəḇō was borrowed from Akkadian šubû which itself was borrowed from Sumerian šuba ‘multicolored, agate’. The Greek and Latin names derive from the name of the river Achates (the modern Dirillo) in Sicily where this stone was first found (Theophrastus, "De lapid.", 38; Pliny, "Hist. nat.", 37, liv).

The banded agate belongs to the silex family (chalcedony species) and is formed by deposits of siliceous beds in hollows of rocks. This mode of formation results in the bands of various colors which it contains. Its conchoidal cleavage makes it susceptible to a highly polished state.

Agate is not present in the Land of Israel, the etymology may indicate that it was imported from Mesopotamia, where it is also not native, originally perhaps from the Arabian Peninsula, where the aqiq (agate) industry is strong.

=== Amazonite ===
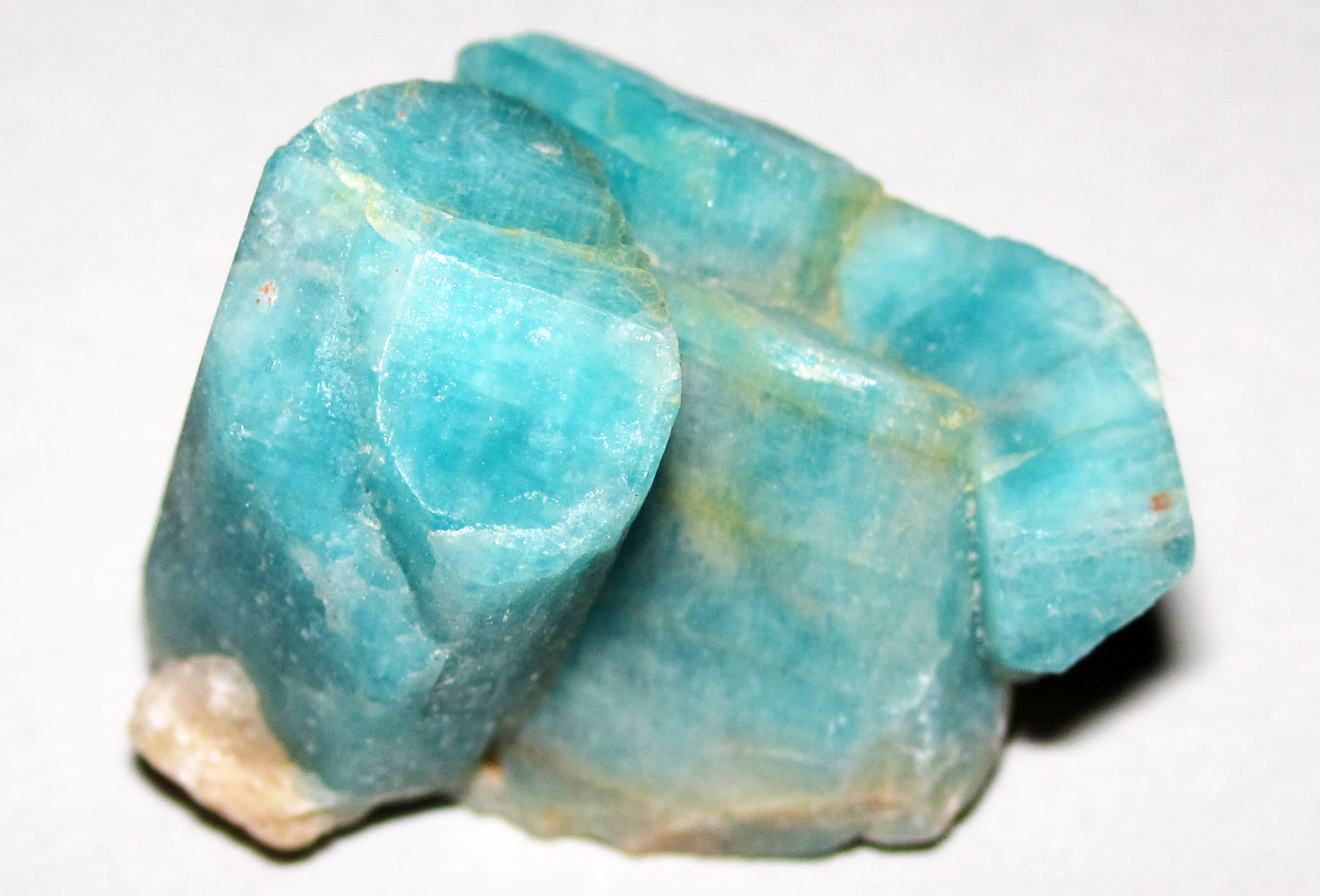
Amazonite (green feldspar)

Amazonite - Hebrew לֶשֶׁם lešem, the first stone of the third row of the priestly breastplate (Exodus 28:19, 39:12), representing Gad. It is missing in the Hebrew of Ezekiel 28:13, but present in the Greek Septuagint.

The Hebrew word lešem is borrowed from the Ancient Egyptian word nšmt, referring to amazonite, a blue-green form of microcline feldspar. The Greek and Latin translations here (Septuagint's λιγύριον ligurion ‘amber’ and Vulgate's ligurius) are probably swapped with another stone or corrupt.

=== Amber ===
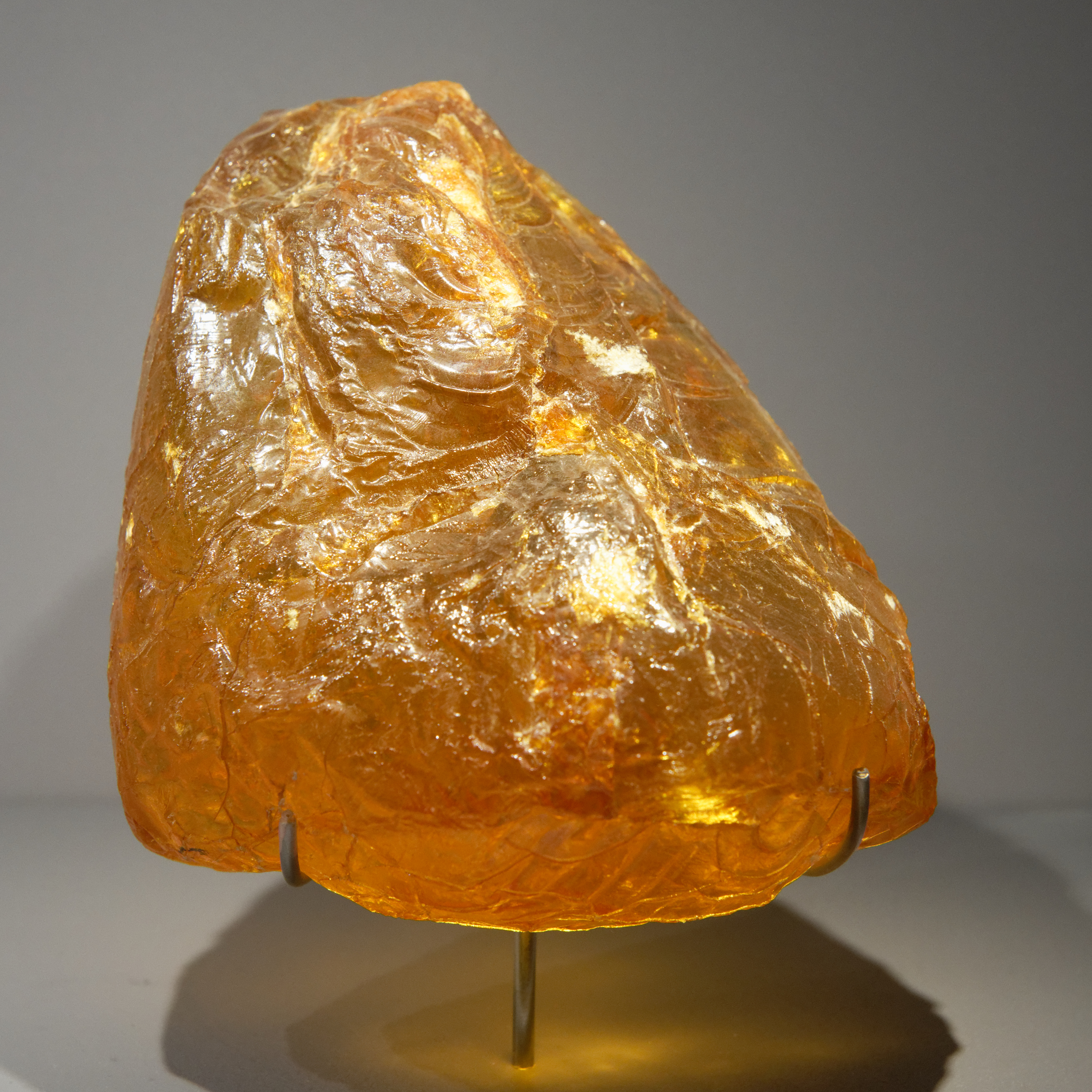
Baltic amber

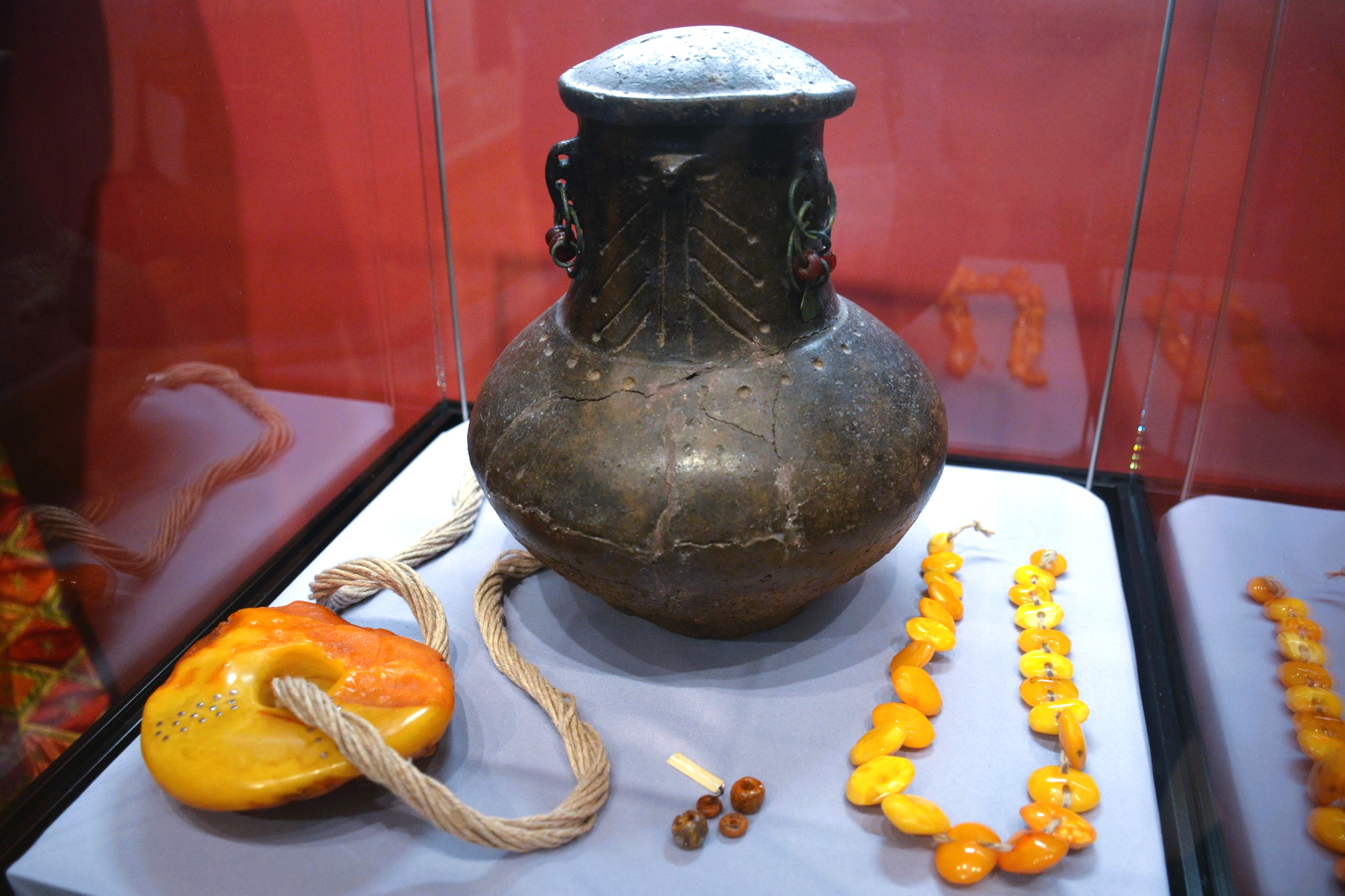
Amber artifacts

Amber - Hebrew תַּרְשִׁישׁ taršīš (Exodus 28:20; 39:13; Ezekiel 1:16; 10:9; 28:13; Song of Songs 5:14; Daniel 10:6); Septuagint χρυσόλιθος chrysolithos (Exodus 28:20; 39:13; Ezekiel 28:13); tharsis (Song of Songs 5:14; Daniel 10:6); tharseis (Ezekiel 1:16; 10:9); Vulgate, chrysolithus (Exodus 28:20; 39:13; Ezekiel 10:9; 28:13; Daniel 10:6), hyacinthus (Song of Songs 5:14); quasi visio maris (Ezekiel 1:16); Revelation 21:20, chrysolithos; Vulgate, chrysolithus. This is the tenth stone of the priestly breastplate, representing the tribe of Zebulun. It stands fourth in the enumeration of Ezekiel 28:13 and is given as the seventh foundation stone of the celestial city in Revelation 21:20.

The term taršīš is a fascinating development: originally an ethnic group in southern Iberia (modern Andalusia), which then became the name of their country, Tartessos. The Phoenicians built large trading ships called an אֳנִיָּה תַּרְשִׁישׁ ʾǒniyyā taršīš to reach this distant location, so over time taršīš came to mean "oceanic" or "maritime." Through a quirk of Hebrew grammar, the phrase אֶבֶן תַּרְשִׁישׁ ʾeb̠en taršīš "stone of the oceanic vessel" was reinterpreted as "taršīš-stone," giving amber its Hebrew name based on the ships that transported it.

The gemstone taršīš is identifiable as Baltic amber, not local Lebanese amber. While Lebanese amber was available, Baltic amber acquired through maritime trade began displacing it in the Levant starting in the 14th century BCE. The amber traveled from the Baltic region through European trading centers to Mediterranean ports via what archeologists call the amber road. The identification of taršīš as amber is supported by the description of the stone in Daniel 10:6 as luminous and warm-colored, coinciding with archaeological evidence of Baltic amber's presence in the ancient Levant during the relevant time period. Unlike other proposed identifications (such as chrysolite, topaz, or tiger's eye), amber was actually known in Ancient Israel.

=== Amethyst ===
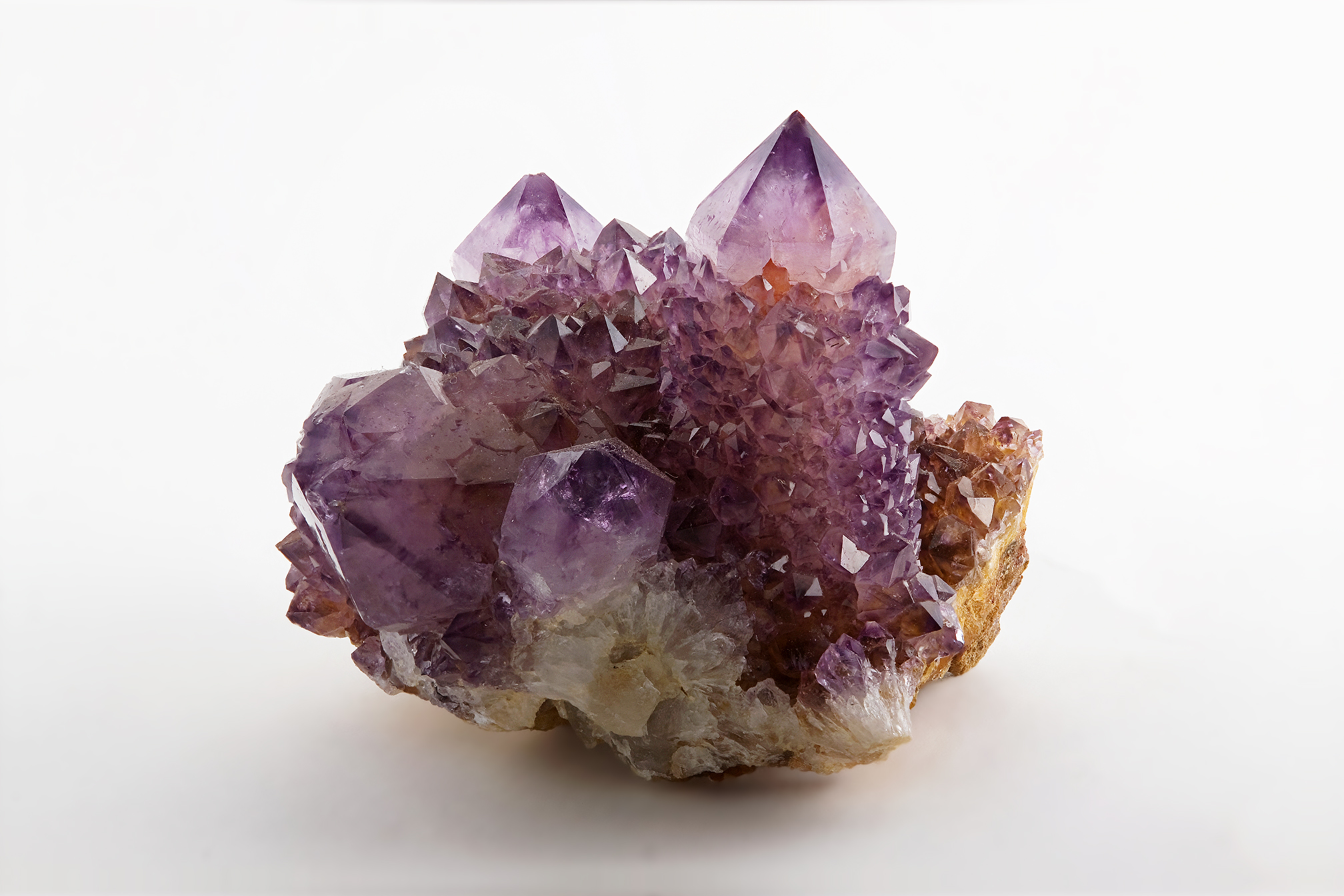
Amethyst. Magaliesburg, South Africa

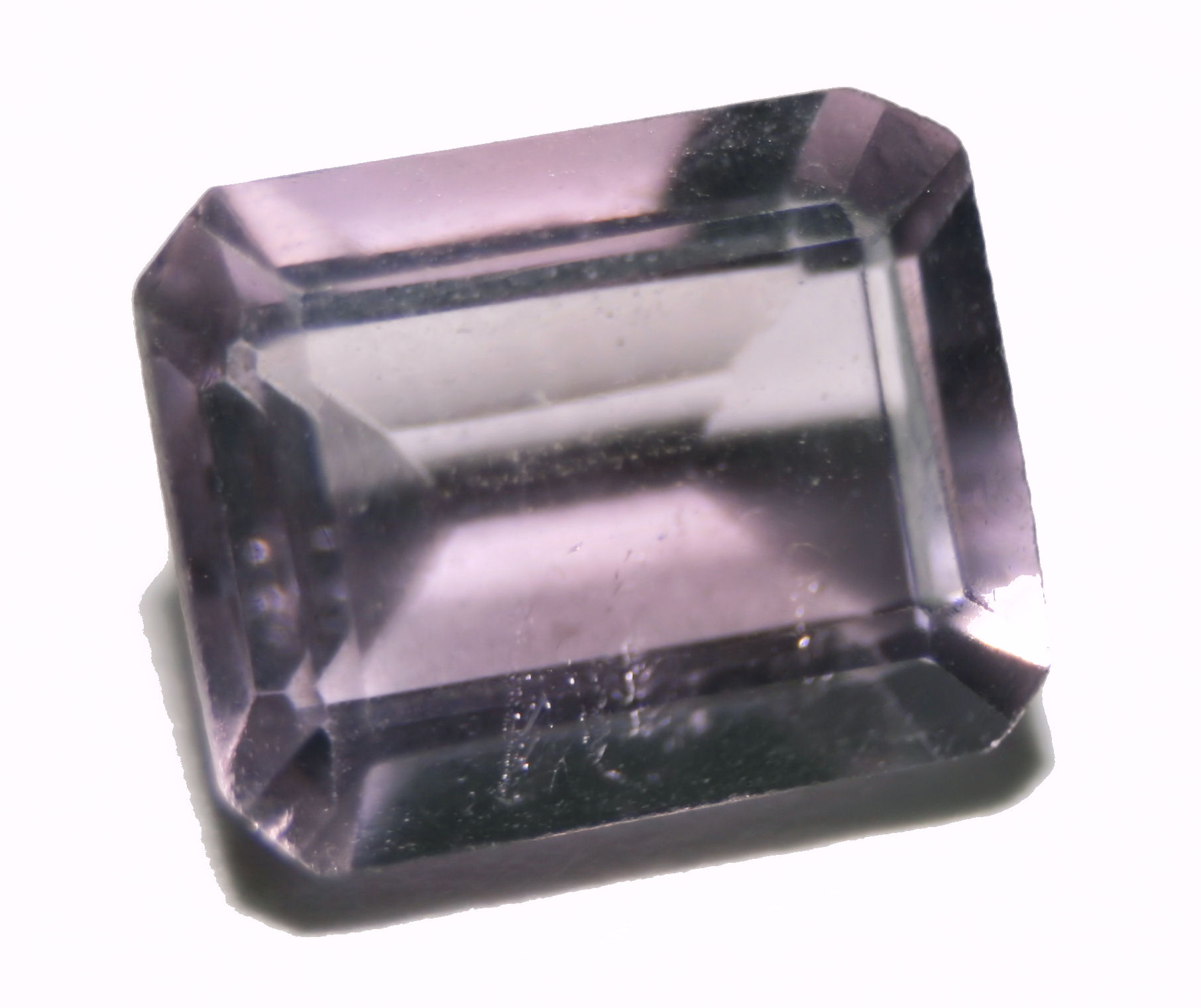
Facet Cut Amethyst

Amethyst - Greek ἀμέθυστος amethystos (Revelation 21:20). Amethyst is not known appear in the Hebrew Bible, as no Hebrew gemstone name can be securely associated with the stone. However, the stone was known among the Israelites.

This is the twelfth and last stone of the foundation of the New Jerusalem. The Greek name amethystos alludes to the popular belief that amethyst prevented intoxication; as such, drinking vessels were made of amethyst for festivities, and carousers wore amulets made of it to counteract the action of wine.

The amethyst is a brilliant transparent stone of a purple color and varies in shade from violet purple to rose. The amethyst is found in a variety of sizes and easily engraved or shaped.

=== Aquamarine ===
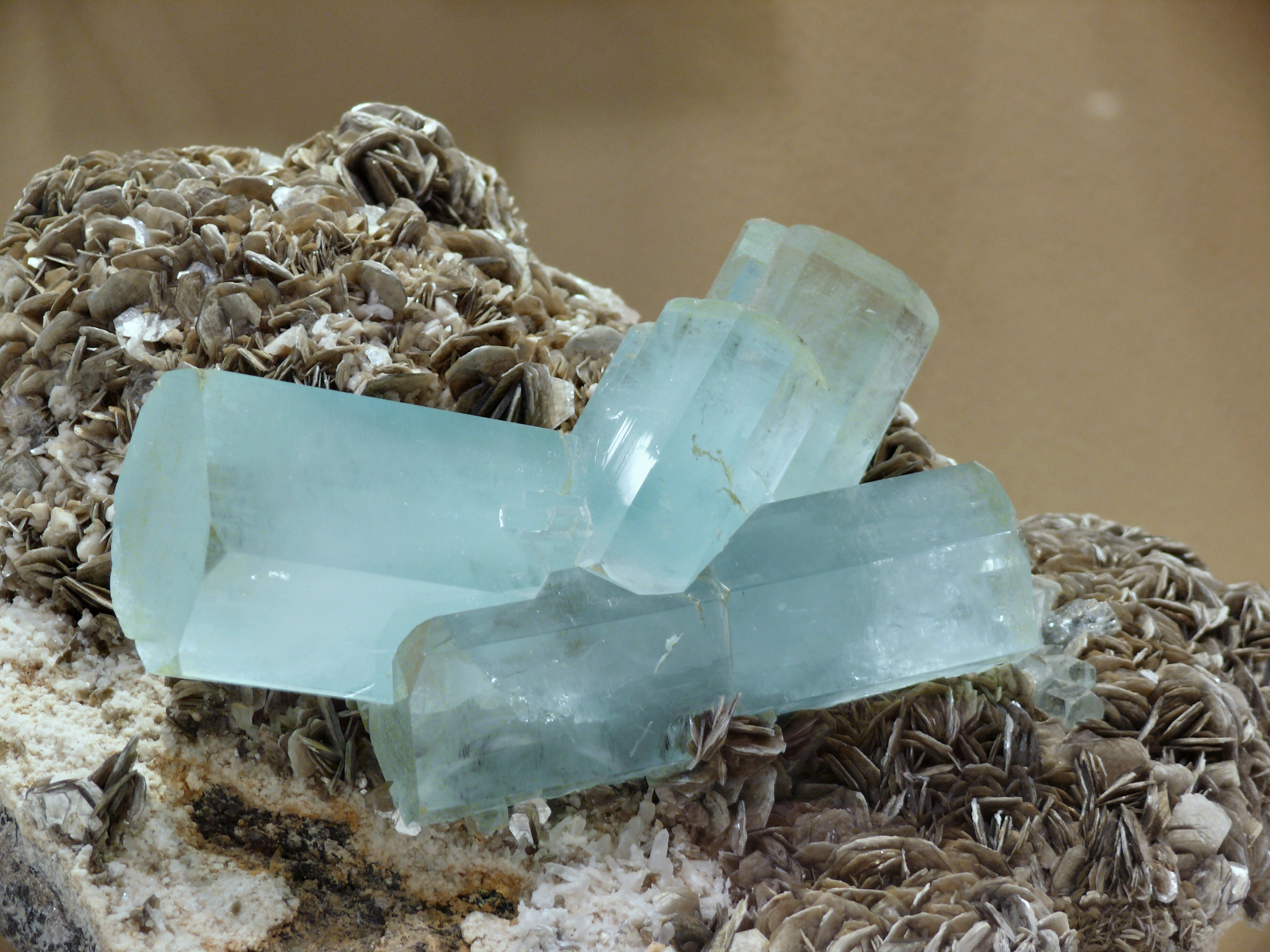
Aquamarine crystals on matrix

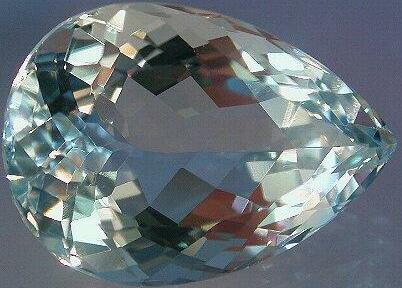
Faceted aquamarine

Aquamarine - Greek beryllos, Latin beryllus. Revelation 21:20, gives it as the eighth stone of the foundation of the New Jerusalem.

Beryl is a stone composed of silica, alumina, and glucina with aquamarine and emerald being the same species of gemstone. The difference between aquamarine and emerald is color. Aquamarine is a cyan or light blue variety of beryl, while emerald is a bright green variety.

Aquamarine derives its color from a small quantity of iron oxide. Beryl occurs in the shape of either a pebble or of an hexagonal prism. It is found in metamorphic limestone, slate, mica schist, gneiss and granite. In ancient times it was imported from India via the Red Sea trade.

=== Carnelian ===
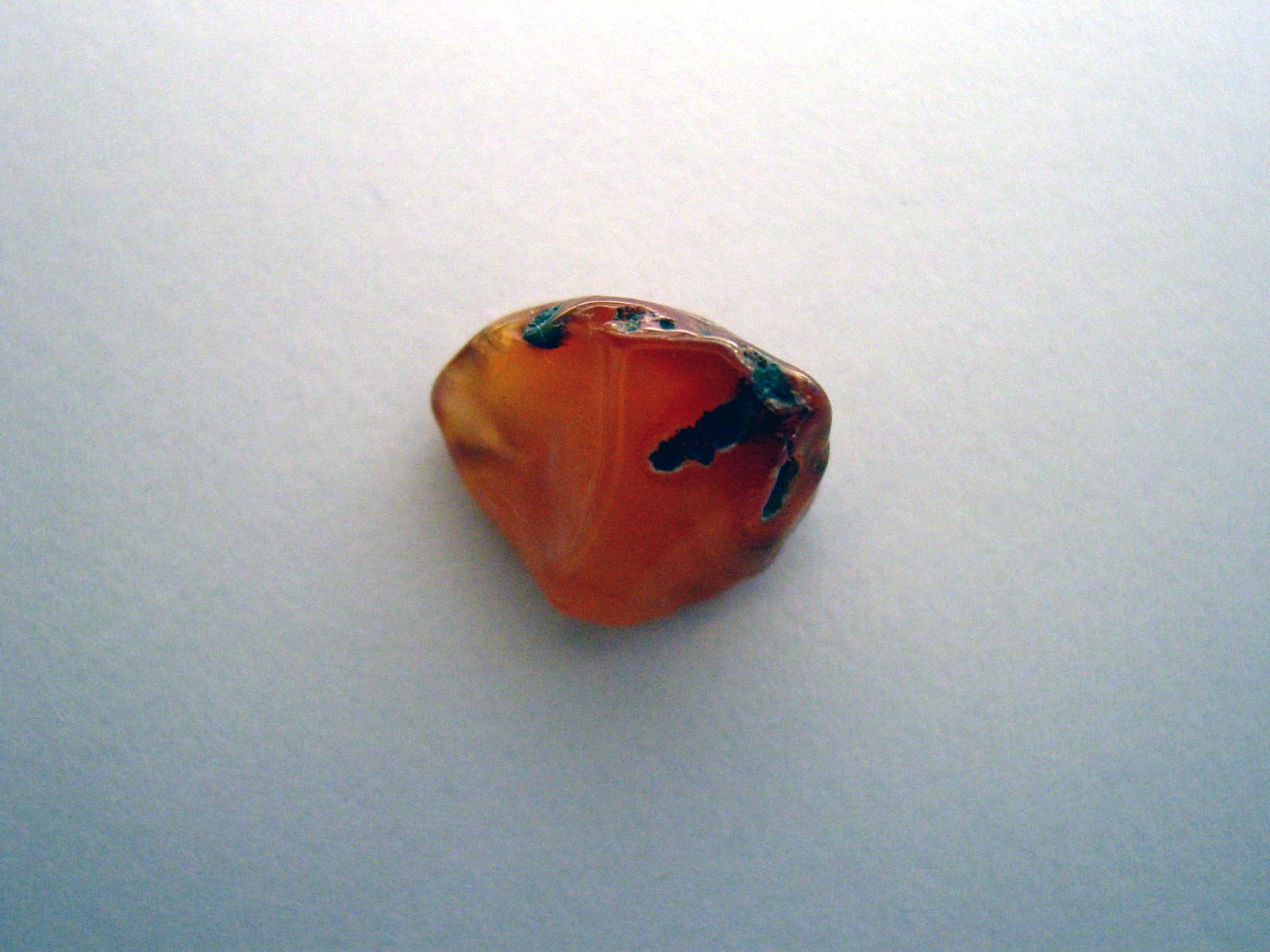
Polished pebble of carnelian

Carnelian - Hebrew אֹדֶם ʾōḏem, Greek σάρδιον sardion; Latin sardius; the first stone of the breastplate (Exodus 28:17, 39:10) representing Ruben; also the first among the stones of the King of Tyre (Ezekiel 28:13); the sixth foundation stone of the celestial city (Revelation 21:19).

Hebrew ʾōḏem derives from the Hebrew root meaning "red". Carnelian is called sardion in Greek. Theophrastus (De lap., 55) and Pliny (Hist. nat., XXXVII, xxxi) derive sardion from the name of the city of Sardes where, they claim, it was first found. The carnelian is a siliceous stone and a species of chalcedony.

Carnelian is a flesh-hued red, varying from the palest flesh-color to a deep blood-red. It is of a conchoidal structure. Normally its color is without clouds or veins; but sometimes delicate veins of extremely light red or white are found arranged much like the rings of an agate. Carnelian was historically popular for rings and seals.

=== Chalcedony, Blue ===
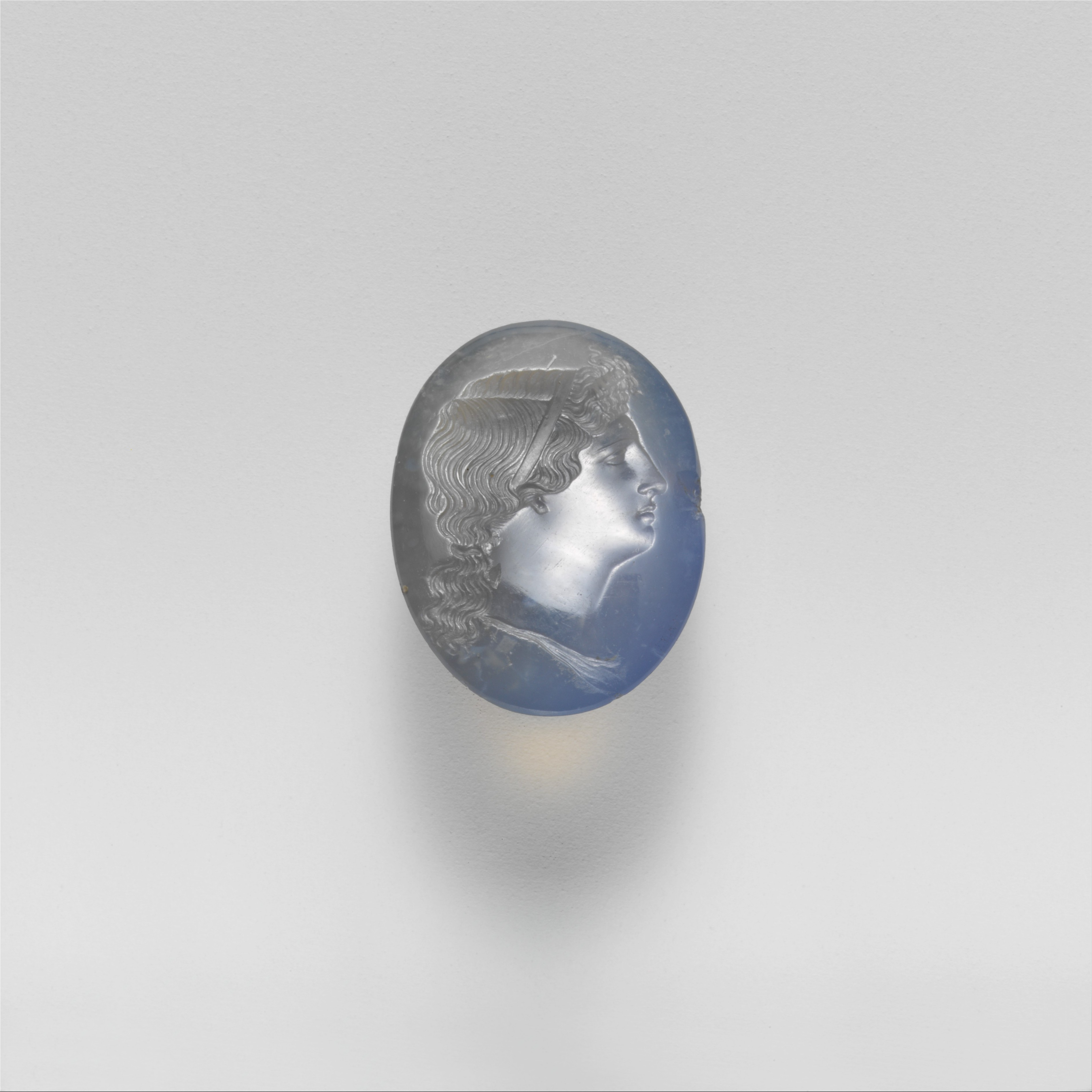
Blue chalcedony intaglio of a woman (Greek)

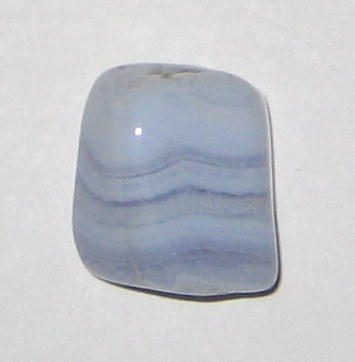
Namibian "blue lace agate", a common trade name for Namibian blue chalcedony.

Blue Chalcedony - Hebrew יָשְׁפֶה yošp̄e, Greek ἴασπις iaspis, Latin jaspis; the twelfth stone of the breastplate (Exodus 28:18, 39:11), representing the tribe of Benjamin. In the Greek and Latin texts it comes sixth, and so also in Ezekiel 28:13; in Revelation it is the first (21:19).

This shared word is part of a large family of similar terms found throughout the Mediterranean and Asia. The ultimate source of these word may lie in a now lost Indo-Iranian form.

In Pliny’s Natural History, iaspis is a generic term that encompasses fourteen types of gemstones. This makes it difficult to determine the identity of the stone intended in the original text, if a particular type was intended at all. Epiphanius mentions that "there is an iaspis, the so-called ancient, which is like snow or sea foam". This fits blue chalcedony, a highly prized gemstone in the Ancient Near East. Because the Septuagint translated yošp̄e with the visually similar stone beryllos "aquamarine" (even though aquamarine was not accessible to the Ancient Israelites), this strongly indicates that yošp̄e should be specifically identified with blue chalcedony.

=== Chalcedony, Chrome ===
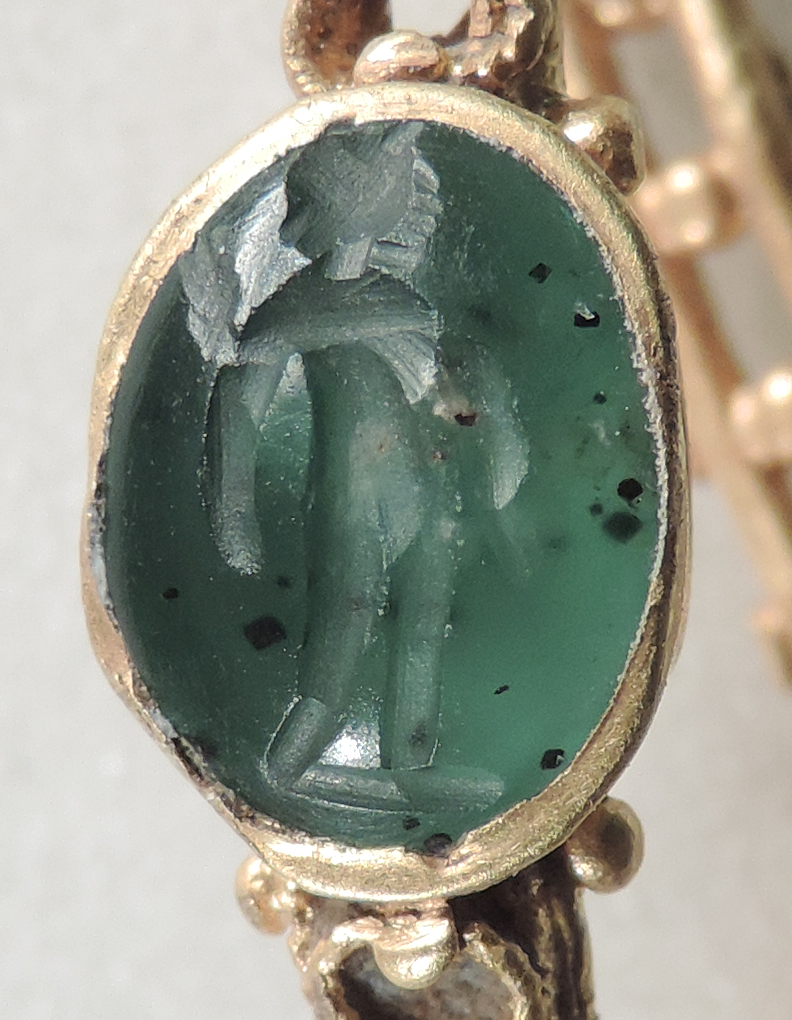
Chrome Chalcedony, set in engraved ring (Roman).

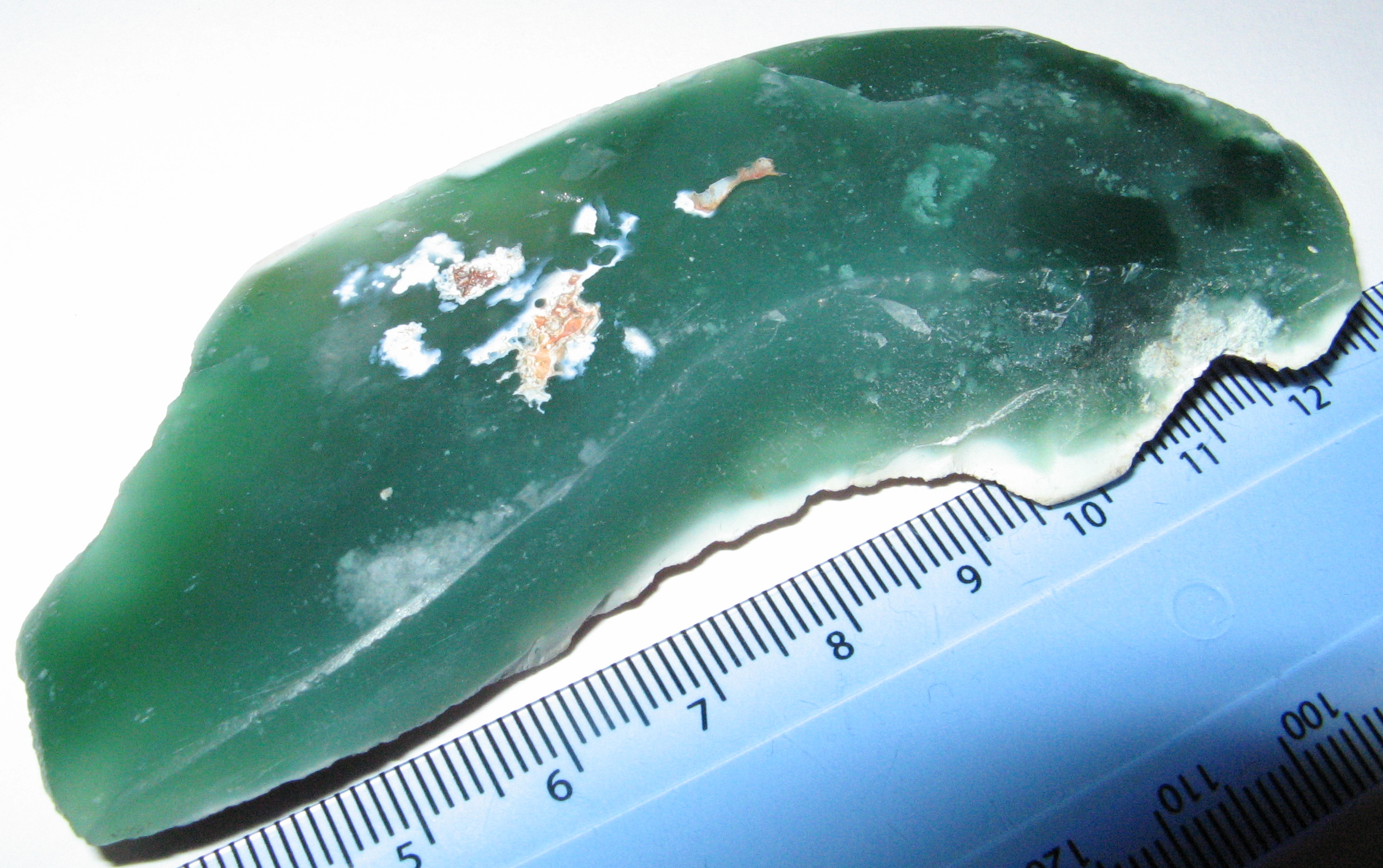
Chrome chalcedony, raw.

Chrome Chalcedony - Greek χρυσόπρασος chrysoprasos, the tenth foundation stone of the celestial Jerusalem (Revelation 21:20). This likely refers to a chrome chalcedony (and not a nickel-colored chrysoprase, as the word is used today), which was known in the Roman world at the time. It is a type of green agate, composed mostly of silica and colored green by a small percentage of chromium.

=== Coral ===
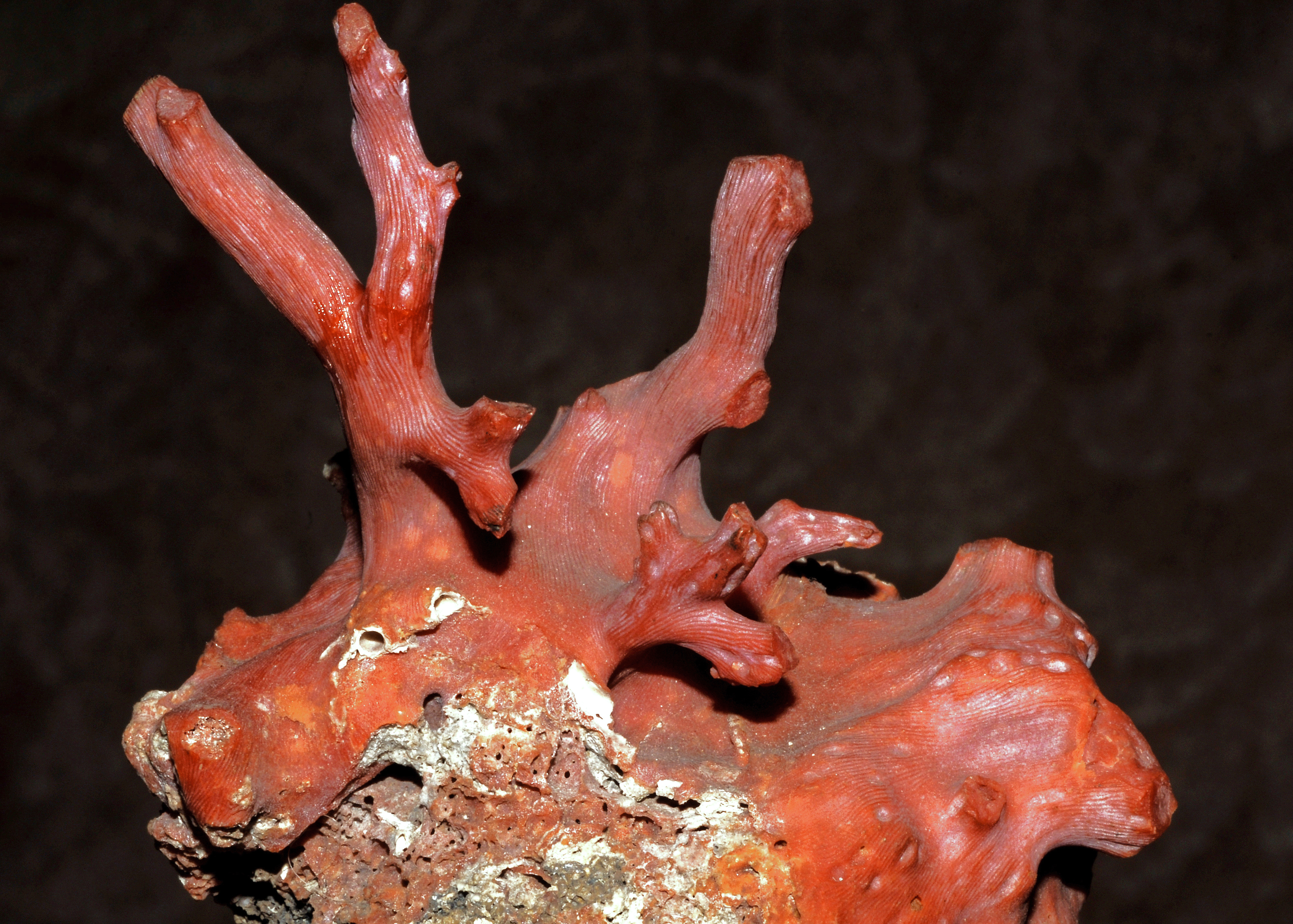
Corallium rubrum

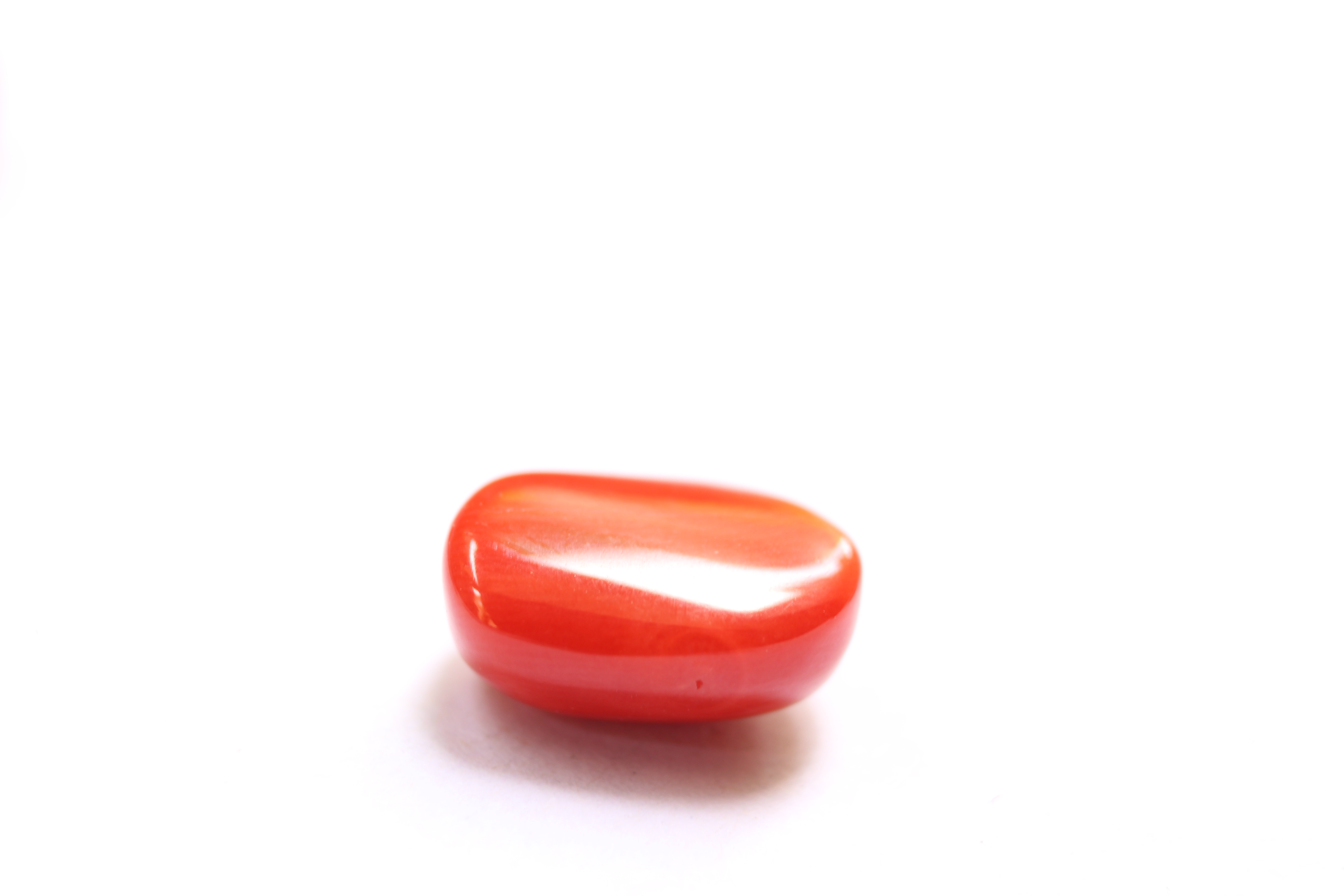
Red coral gemstone

Coral - Hebrew רָאמֹת rāmōth (Job 28:18, Ezekiel 27:16), Greek meteora, ramoth; Vulg. excelsa, sericum. In one instance the ancient translations went so far as to simply transliterate the Hebrew word. The Hebrew word rāmōth is cognate to Arabic ra'ma(t), a type of seashell.

The Israelites apparently made little use of coral, and it is seldom mentioned in their writings. In Ezekiel 27:16, coral is mentioned as one of the articles brought by the Syrians to Tyre.

The Phoenicians mounted beads of coral on collars and garments. These corals were obtained by Babylonian pearl-fishers in the Red Sea and the Indian Ocean.

The coral referred to in the Bible is the precious coral (Corallium rubrum), the formation of which is a calcareous secretion of certain polyps resulting in a tree-like formation. Presently coral is found in the Mediterranean, the northern coast of Africa furnishing the dark red, Sardinia the yellow or salmon-colored, and the coast of Italy the rose-pink coral. One of the greatest coral-fisheries of the present day is Torre del Greco, near Naples.

=== Crystal Quartz ===
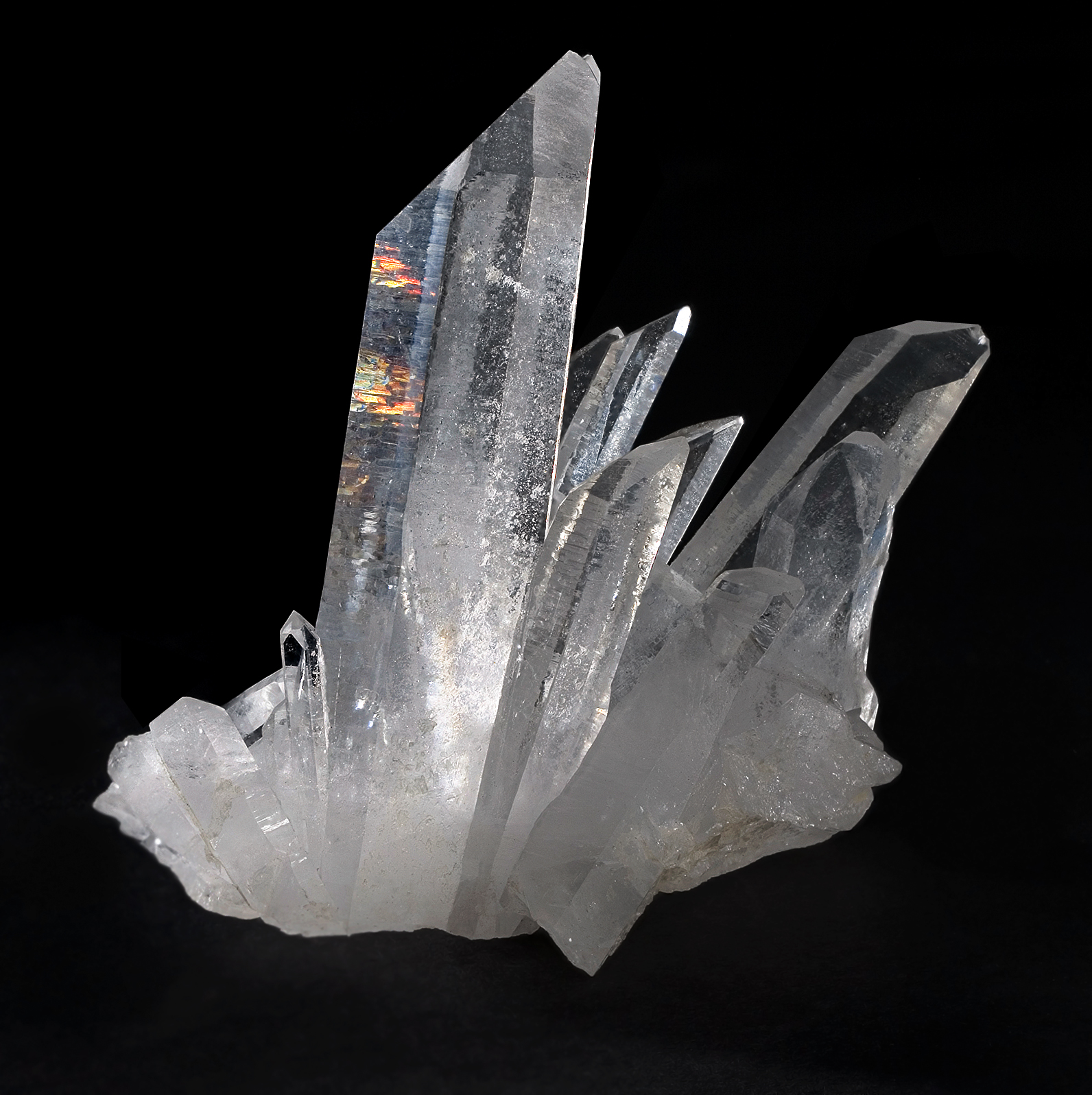
Quartz

Crystal - Hebrew גָּבִישׁ gavish (Job, 28:18), Greek gabis, κρύσταλλος crystallos, Latin eminentia (Job); krystallos (Revelation 4:6, 21:11, 22:1). Crystal quartz is a transparent crystalline variety of the mineral quartz, resembling glass. Job lists gavish (crystal quartz) alongside gold, onyx, lapis lazuli, glass, coral, and peridot as a valuable trade good.

The Hebrew word gavish is a wanderwort, which probably originated in historical Nubia, modern Sudan. Greek κρύσταλλος crystallos ‘crystal quartz’ primarily meant ‘ice’, derived from κρύος kryos ‘ice’. The Greeks believed that crystal quartz was supercooled ice, and applied the word crystallos to the both of them.

It is likely that the Israelites acquired crystal quartz from Nubia. The Nubian Kerma culture created beads from quartz crystals in their natural shape, sometimes coating them in a copper-based glaze.

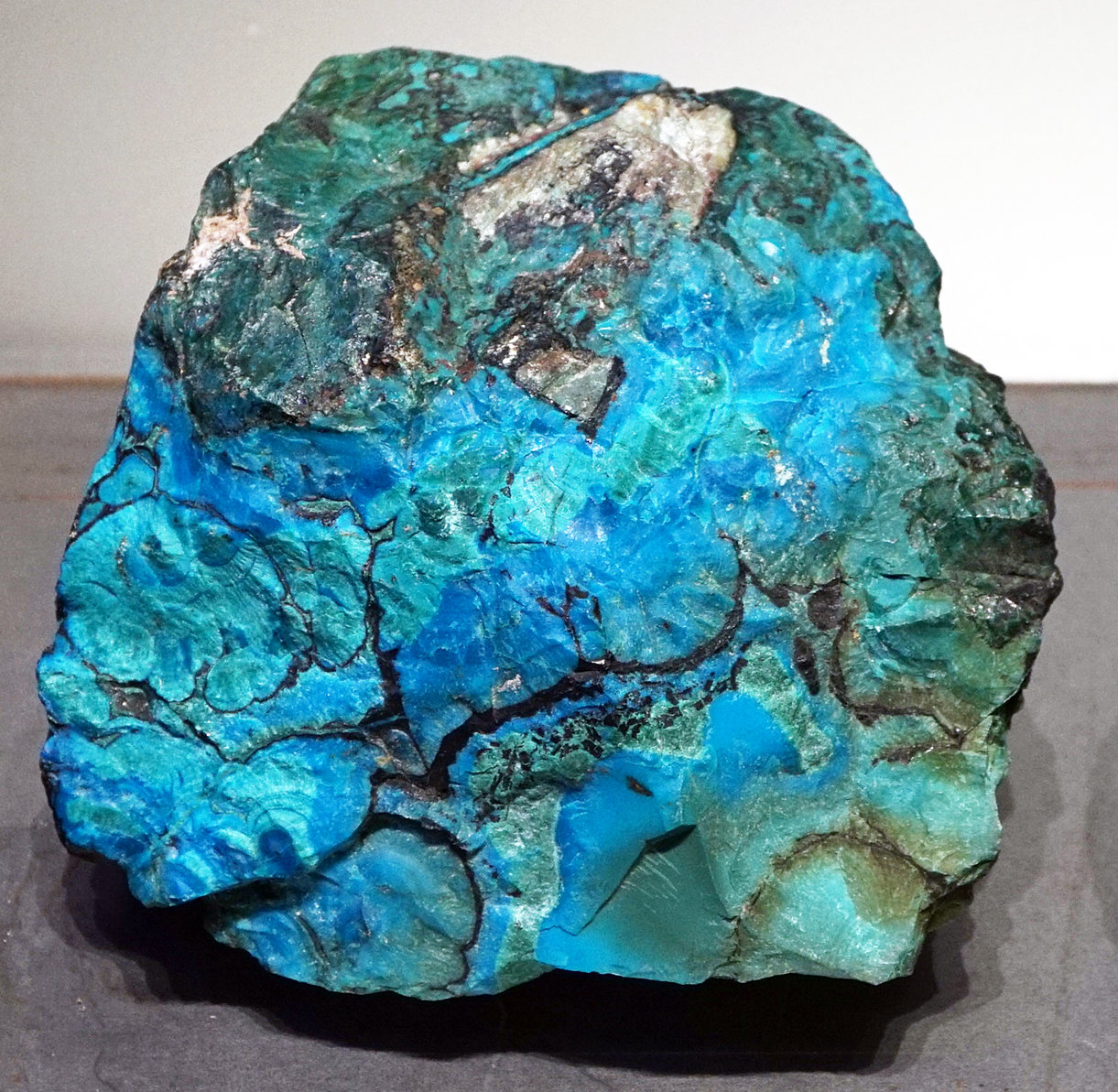
Eilatstone rough

=== Eilatstone ===
Eilatstone - Hebrew פּוּךְ pukh.

The Hebrew name pukh must have been borrowed from the Ancient Egyptian term fkꜢt meaning "turquoise", yet reapplied to local Canaanite geology. The Israelites used eilatstone both as a gemstone, as an ornamental stone in construction, and as the base for kohl.

=== Emerald ===
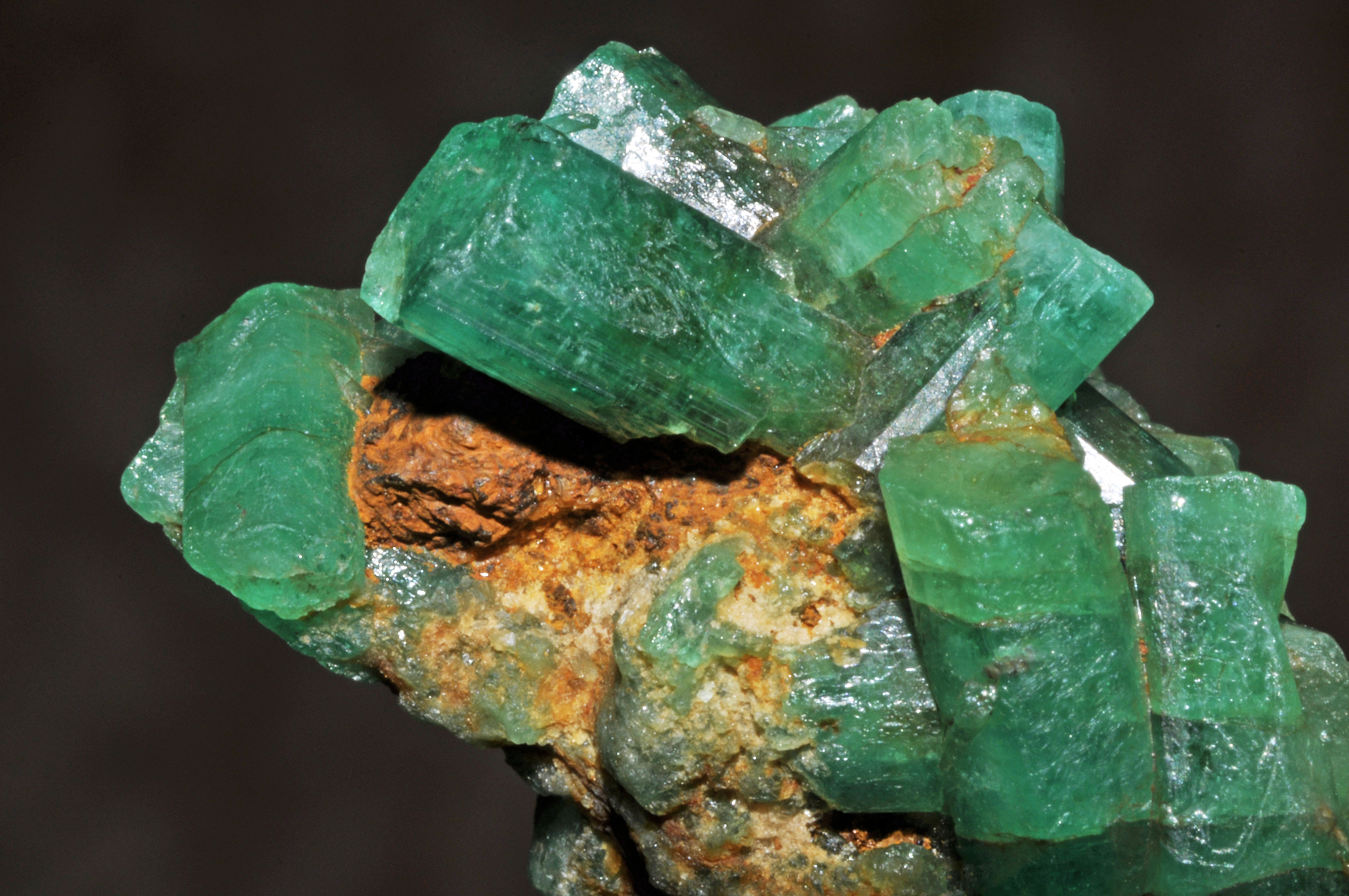
Emerald

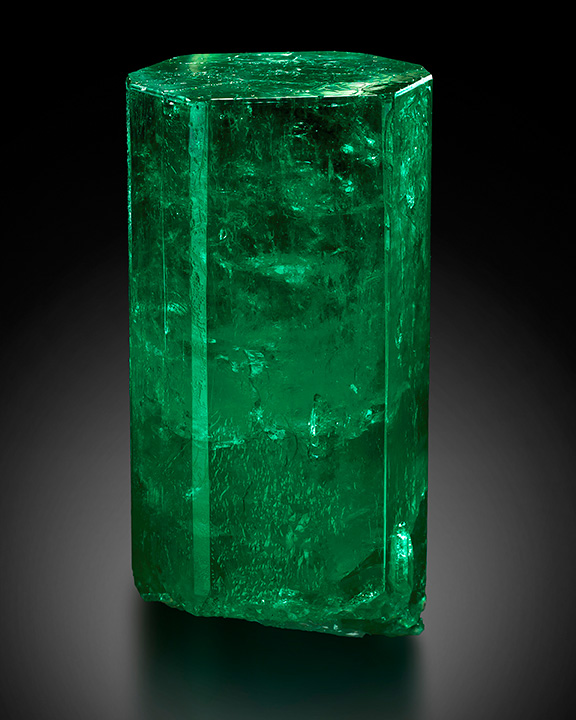
Emerald

Emerald - Greek σμάραγδος smaragdos, Latin smaragdus. The fourth foundation stone of the celestial Jerusalem (Rev. 21:19).

The most popular identification for bareḳeth is emerald, but this identification is impossible. The earliest known emerald is a single unengraved stone mounted in a gold ring, dated circa 330–300 BC. A 3rd century BC date is far too late for emeralds to appear in Exodus and Ezekiel. However, the Greek and Latin terms smaragdos, smaragdus are broad enough to include other green gemstones, the most valuable of which was the emerald.

Emerald is a green variety of beryl and is composed of silicate of alumina and glucina. Structurally, it is a hexagonal crystal with a brilliant reflecting green color. The emerald is highly polished and is found in metamorphic rocks, granites, and mica schist. Many of the finest specimens have been found in Muzo, Bogotá, South America but the ancients obtained the stone from Egypt. Of all the emerald-bearing locales in the world, the only ones in proximity to the Levant are a series of sites in the southern Eastern Desert of Egypt, referred to as Mons Smaragdos. These emerald deposits were first exploited no earlier than the Ptolemaic period, based on the material remains at the worker camp at Sikait. Recent excavations have securely dated the founding of this settlement to the 3rd century BC.

=== Garnet ===
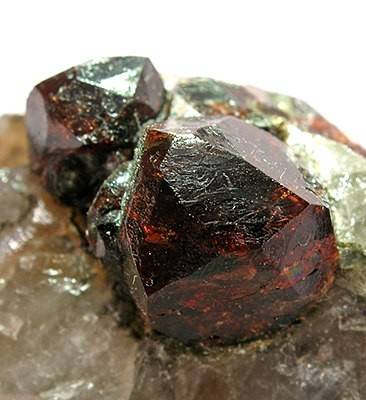
Almandine garnet crystals on matrix.

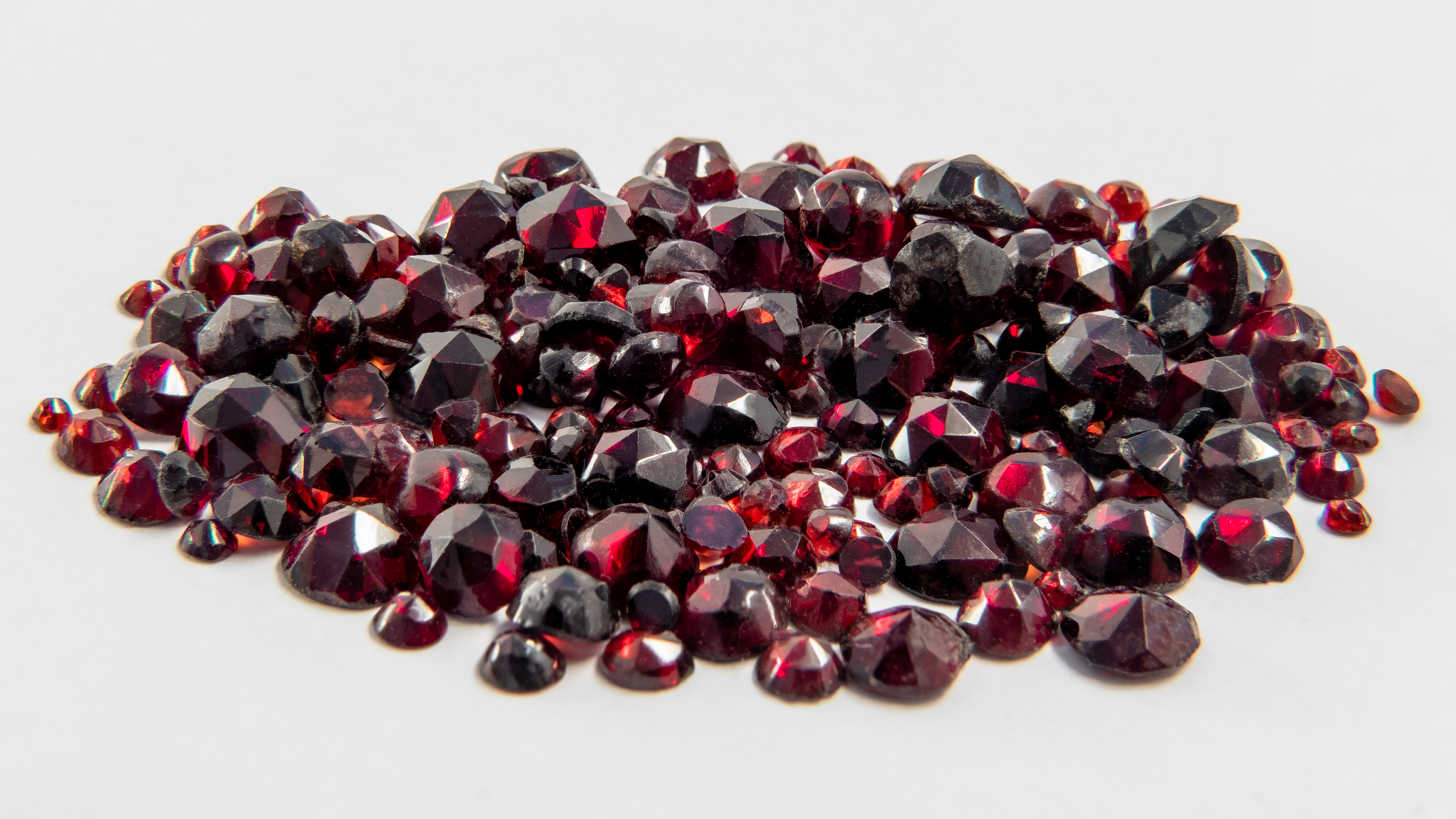
Faceted garnets

Garnet - Hebrew כַּדְכֹּד kad̠kōd̠ (Isaiah 54:12, Ezekiel 27:16) and אֶקְדָּח ʾeḳdāḥ (Ezekiel 27:16), Greek anthrax (Exodus 28:18; 39:11; Ezekiel 28:13; omitted in Ezekiel 27:16), Latin carbunculus (Exodus 28:18; 39:11; Ezekiel 28:13), gemma (Ezekiel 27:16). The carbuncle was the first stone of the second row of the priestly breastplate and it represented Judah, and is also the eighth stone mentioned of the riches of the King of Tyre (Ezekiel 28:13). An imported object, not a native product, (Ezekiel 28:16); it is the third stone of the foundation of the celestial Jerusalem (Revelation 21:19).

Kad̠kōd̠ is used only twice in the Bible, possibly borrowed from a Carian word for this stone. Even more rare, ʾeḳdāḥ is only mentioned once, a word likely loaned from another Semitic language.

Garnet probably corresponded to the anthrax of Theophrastus (De lap., 18), the carbunculus of Pliny (Hist. nat., XXXVII, xxv), and the charchedonius of Petronius. Theophrastus describes it such that, "its color is red and of such a kind that when it is held against the sun it resembles a burning coal." He also relates that the most perfect carbuncles were brought from Carthage, Marseille, Egypt, and the neighborhood of Siena.

=== Jasper, Green ===
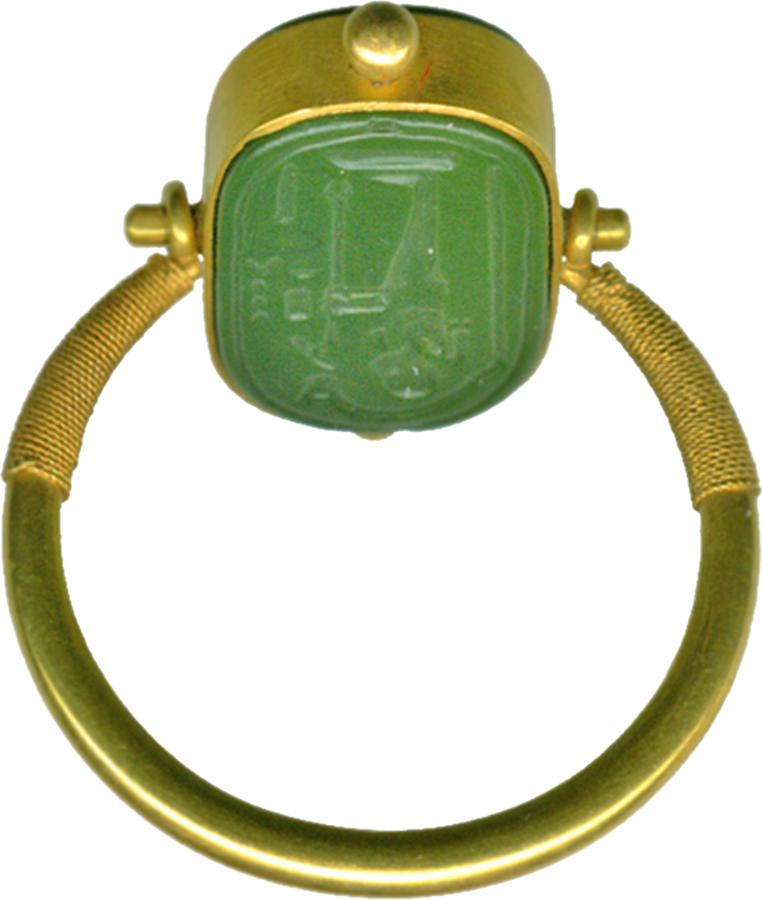
Green Jasper ring of Pharaoh Tutankhamun

Green Jasper - Hebrew בָּרֶקֶת bareḳeth. The third stone of the priestly breastplate (Exodus 28:17, 39:10), representing the tribe of Levi; it is the ninth stone in Ezekiel 28:13, and the first foundation stone of the celestial Jerusalem (Rev. 21:19). The same stone is also mentioned in Tob., 13:16 (Vulg. 21); Judith 10:21 (Vulg. 19); and in the Greek text of Sirach 32:8 (missing in Manuscript B of the Hebrew Genizah manuscripts).

The term bareḳeth can be traced back to Proto-Semitic. It derives from the root w-r-ḳ meaning "yellow-green," originally encompassing a broad range of green precious stones. Over time, this term evolved. For instance, Greek smaragdos and Akkadian barraqtu reflect borrowings of the Hebrew term, adopted to the green gemstones familiar to the speakers of those languages.

The identification of bareḳet with green jasper is based on archaeological evidence. Unlike emerald, which was unknown in biblical times, green jasper was widely used in the Levant and often associated with religious and ornamental purposes. Its rarity and use in trade networks further support its attribution as the gemstone represented on the priestly breastplate.

=== Jasper, Red ===
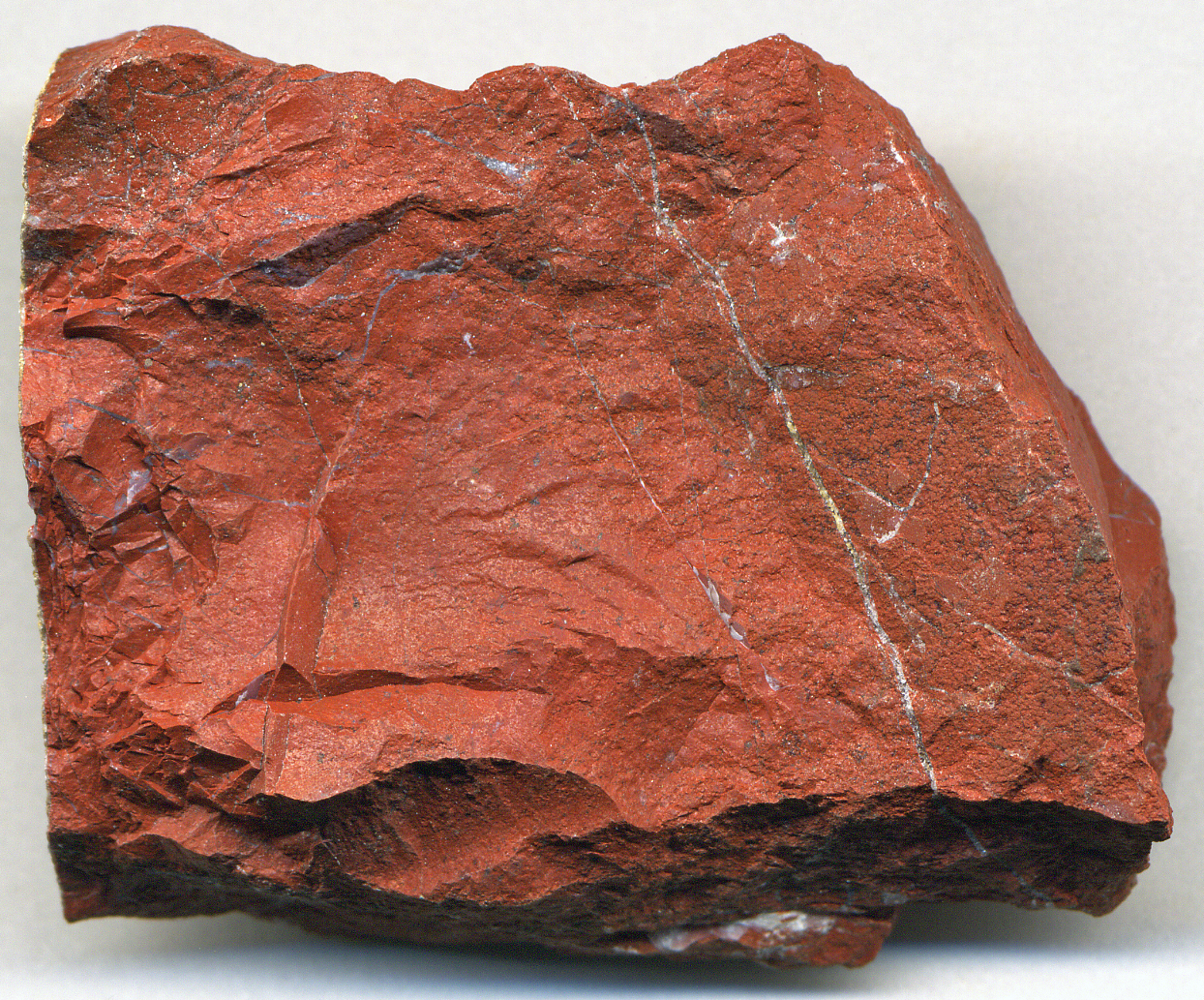
Red jasper rough

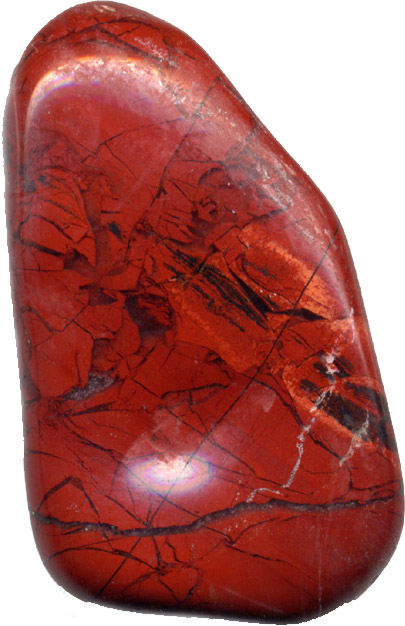
red jasper tumbled

Red Jasper - Hebrew אַחְלָמָה ʾaḥlāmā.

Red Jasper is the third stone in the third row of the priestly breastplate, representing the tribe of Issachar (Exodus 28:19, 39:12); the Septuagint enumerates it among the riches of the King of Tyre (Ezekiel 28:13).

Jasper is an anhydrate quartz composed of silica, alumina, and iron and there are jaspers of nearly every color. There is no reason to believe the Hebrew words for gemstones entirely correspond to modern names. While we use the categorical term "jasper" to refer to various colors, the Israelites may well have distinguished the colors from one another. It is a completely opaque stone of a conchoidal cleavage. It seems to have been obtained by the Israelites from Egypt.

=== Lapis Lazuli ===
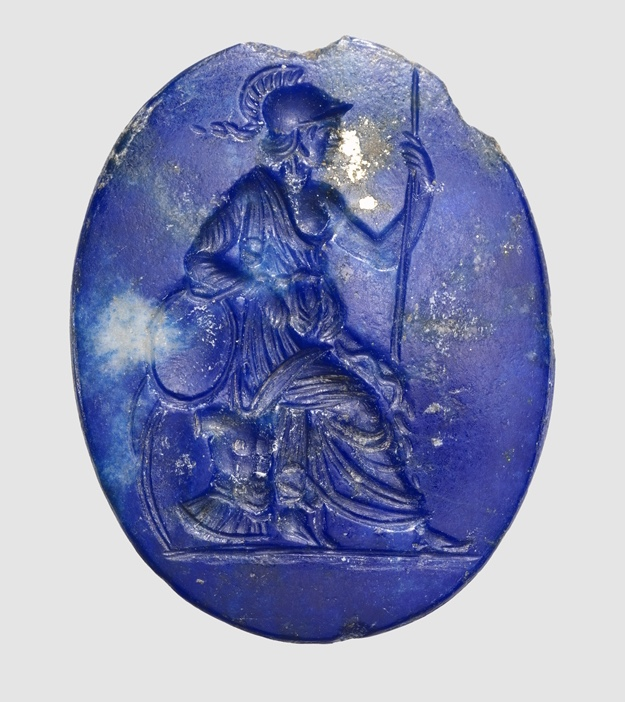
Lapis intaglio

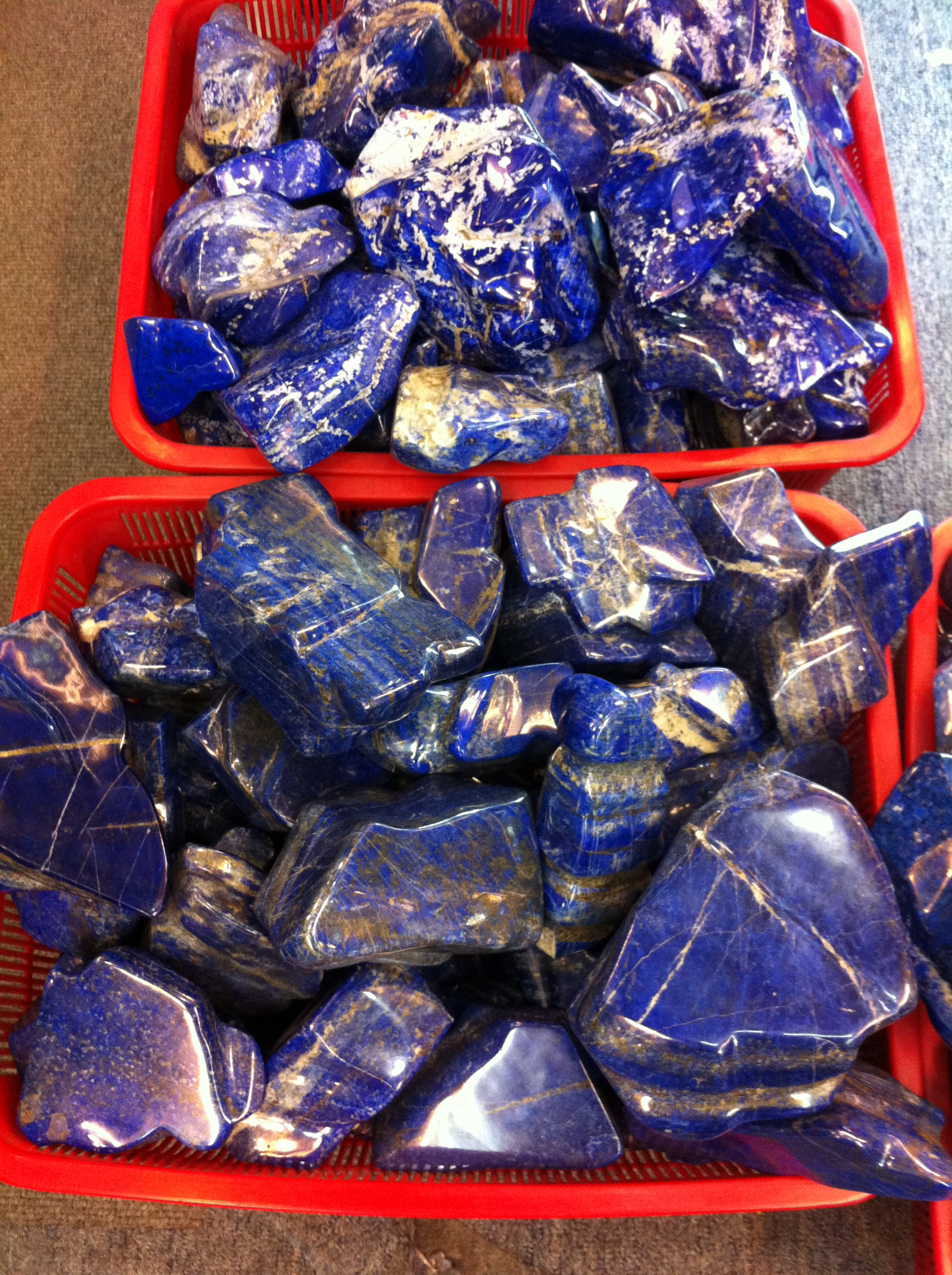
Polished lapis lazuli

Lapis lazuli - Hebrew סַפִּיר sappir, Greek σάπφειρος sappheiros, Latin sapphirus. Lapis was the fifth stone of the priestly breastplate (Exodus 28:18, 39:11), representing the tribe of Issachar. It is the seventh stone in Ezekiel 28:13 (in the Hebrew text, but occurring fifth in the Greek translation). The stones is also mentioned with frequency elsewhere (Exodus 24:10, Job 28:6,16, Song 5:14, Isaiah 54:11, Lamentations 4:7; Ezekiel 1:26, 10:1). Sappheiros is also the second foundation stone of the celestial Jerusalem (Revelations 21:19).

Lapis lazuli is frequently confused with sapphire (another blue stone) in the interpretation of ancient texts, but sapphire was scarcely known before the Roman period and the ancients had distinct vocabulary for the gemstones. Lapis lazuli is often speckled with shining pyrites giving it the appearance of being sprinkled with gold dust. It is composed of silica, alumina, and alkali and is an opaque substance easily engraved. Lapis lazuli seems more probable as its qualities are better suited for the purposes of engraving (Lam. 4:7; Exodus 38:17; 39:13).

Lapis lazuli is one of the most frequently occurring gemstones in the Hebrew Bible, and there is little question as to why. Lapis lazuli is a rock consisting of dark blue lazurite with minute golden specks of pyrite and white patches or veins of calcite. The visual appearance of lapis lazuli appears like the constellated night sky, the pyrite particles resembling stars, and calcite bands galaxies in a dark-blue celestial canopy. Two of Ezekiel's references to the stone (1:26, 10:1) echo Exodus 24:10 in likening the night sky to sappīr.

In the Ancient Near East, an association between lapis lazuli and the divine was a common cultural motif, born of the resemblance of the stone to the night sky. This association is implicit in the Hebrew Bible, and is the likely origin of the biblical commandment to wear a string of tekheleth on the fringes of ones' garment.

The source of lapis lazuli in the Ancient Near East was Badakhshan, the same location where the stone is primarily mined today.

=== Obsidian ===
Obsidian - Hebrew צֹר ṣōr.

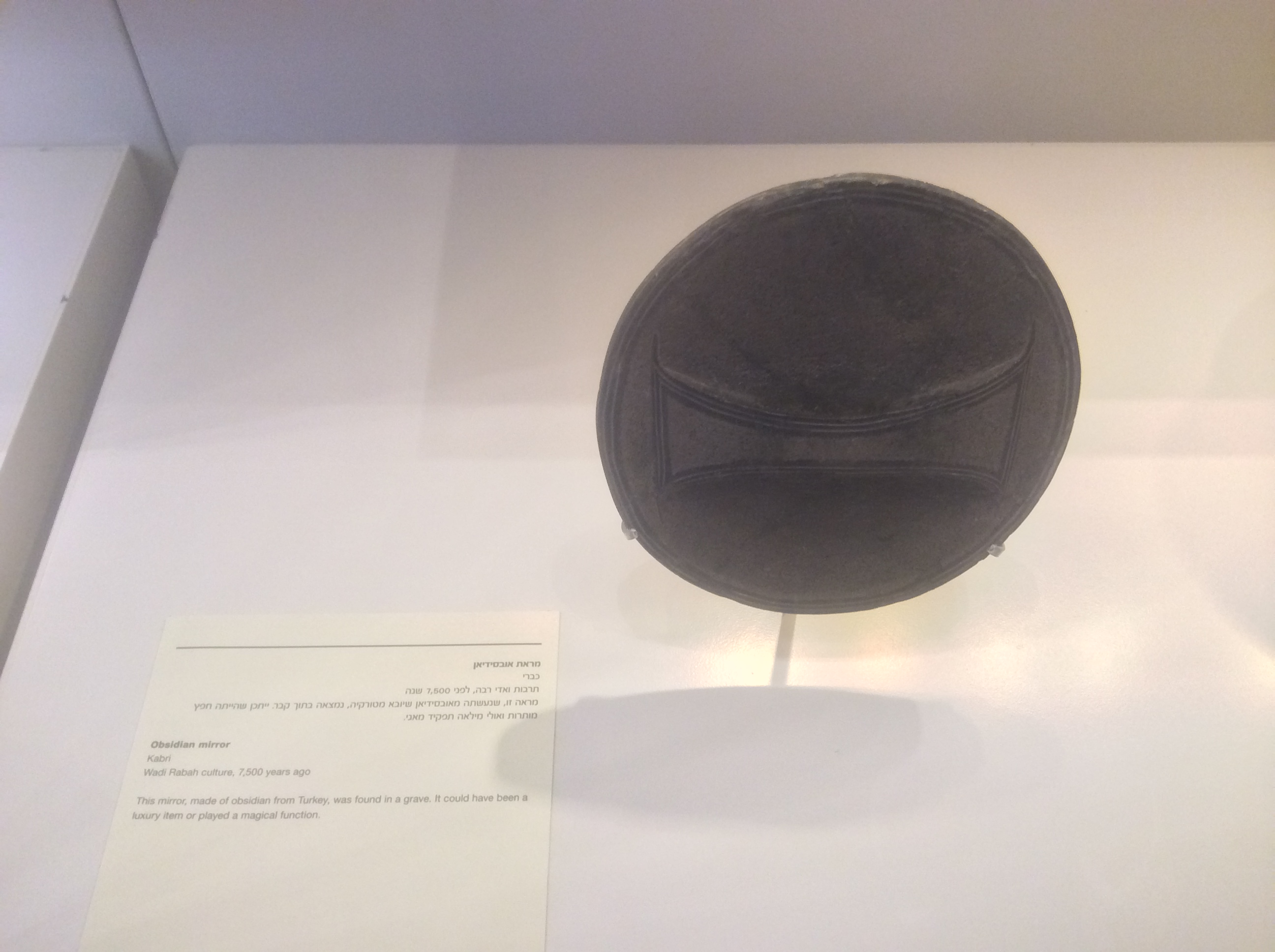
Obsidian Mirror from Tel Kabri

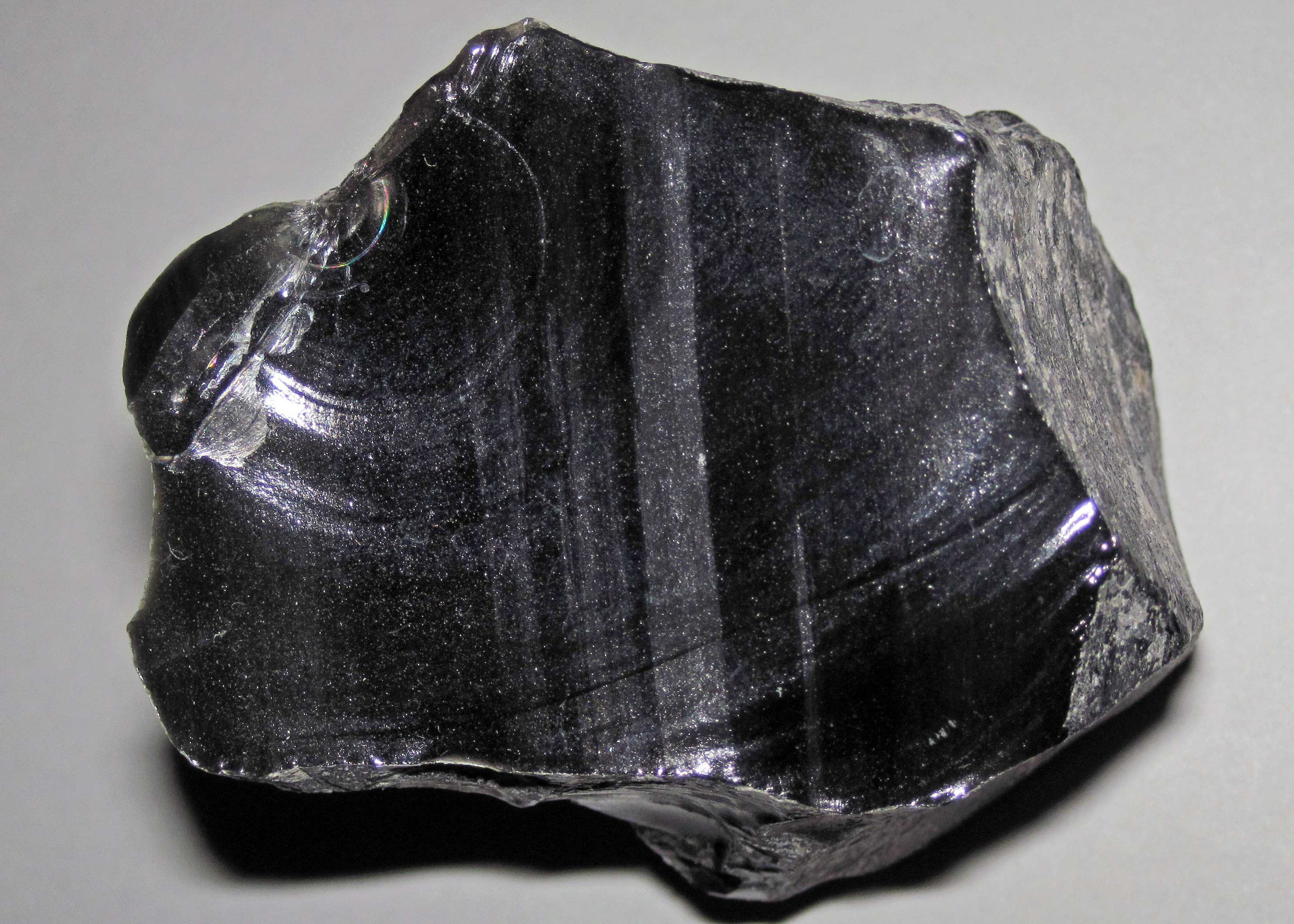
Obsidian sherd

Ṣōr is inherited from Proto-Semitic *ṱurr- which bore the meaning ‘flint, obsidian’.

Obsidian is a black, translucent stone, technically a form of volcanic glass. In the Bronze Age, it was used for more than merely projectile points, it was carved into objects of various shapes and sizes. This obsidian must have originated at obsidian sources in the mountains of Asia Minor.

=== Onyx ===
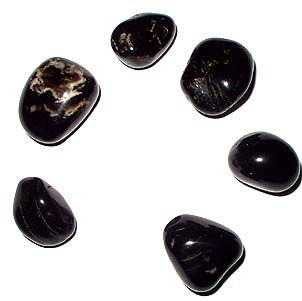
Black Onyx

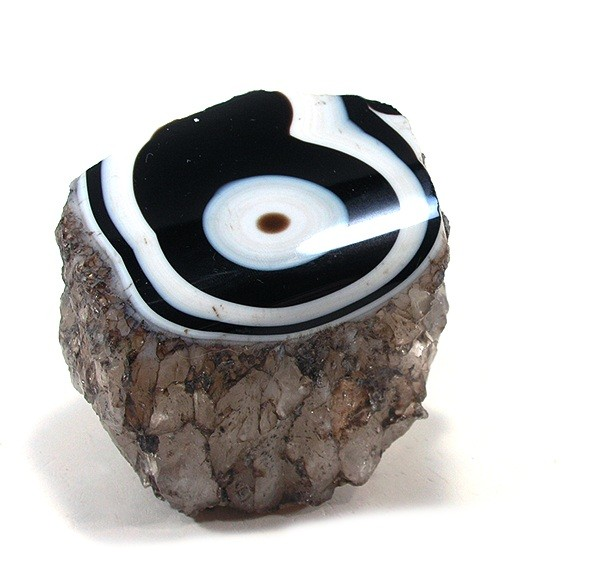
Onyx

Onyx - Hebrew שֹׁהַם shoham, Greek ὀνύχινος onychinos, Latin lapis onychinus. The eleventh stone of the breastplate in the Hebrew and the Vulgate (Exodus 28:20, 39:13), representing the tribe of Joseph. In the Septuagint it is the twelfth stone and the fifth in Ezekiel 28:13 in the Hebrew, but the twelfth in the Greek.

Genesis 2:12 mentions that shoham occurred in the Land of Havilah, the onyx of the Arabian peninsula must be intended here. I Chronicles 29:2 mentioned that David left shoham be used in the building of the First Temple. As the Queen of Sheba visited Solomon shortly thereafter, where onyx originated from the same geographical area, this detail suggests that Arabian onyx found its way to Israel circa 10th century BC.

Onyx is a variety of quartz analogous to agate and other crypto-crystalline species. It is composed of different layers of variously colored chalcedony much like banded agate in structure, but the layers are in even or parallel planes. This makes it well adapted for the cutting of cameos and was much used by the ancients for that purpose. The colors of the best are perfectly well defined, and are either white and black, or white, brown, and black.

=== Pearl ===
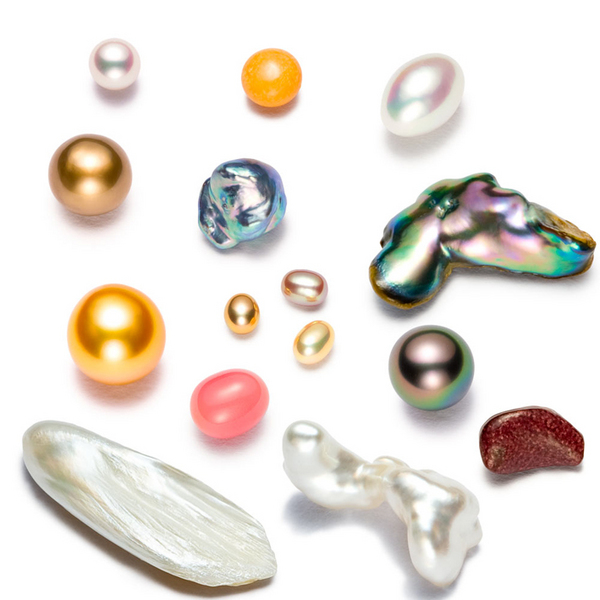
Various pearls

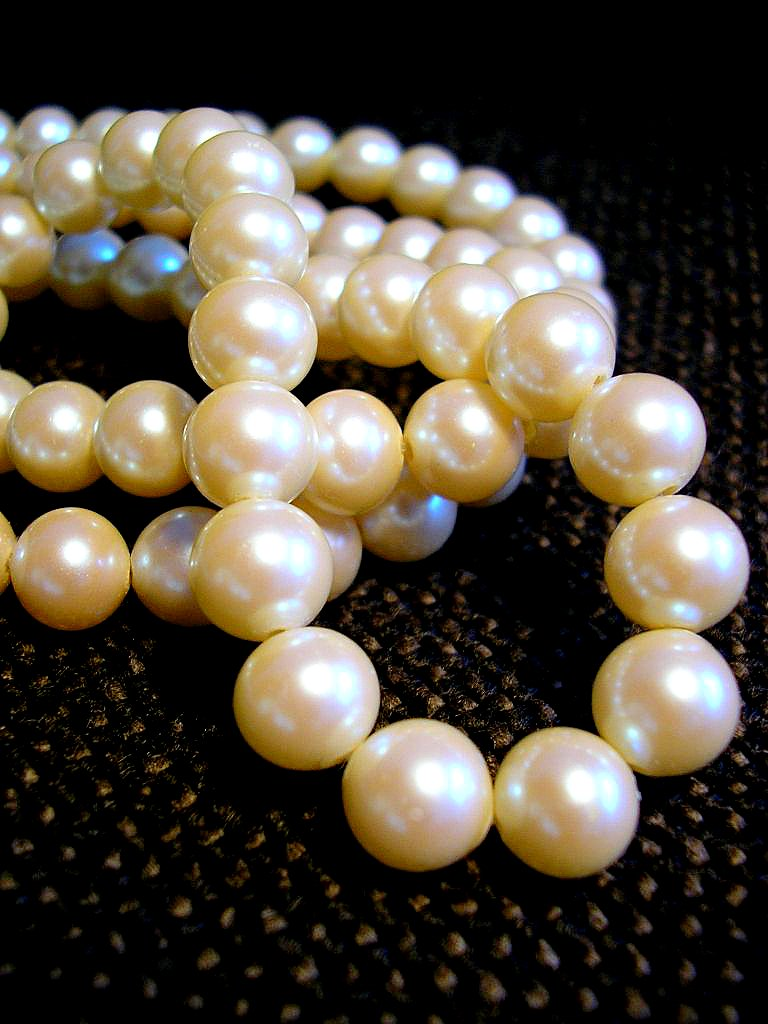
White pearl necklace

Pearl - Greek μαργαρίτης margarites, Latin margarita. In the New Testament, pearls are mentioned in Matthew 7:6, 13:45-46, I Timothy 2:9, and Revelation 17:4, 18:12, 16, 21:21.

Pearl is a concretion consisting chiefly of lime carbonate found in several bivalve molluscs, but especially in Avicula margaritifera. Generally, it has a whitish blue hue, sometimes showing a tinge of pink; but there are also yellow pearls. Pearl was considered the most precious of all among the ancients, and was obtained from the Red Sea, the Indian Ocean, and the Persian Gulf.

=== Peridot ===
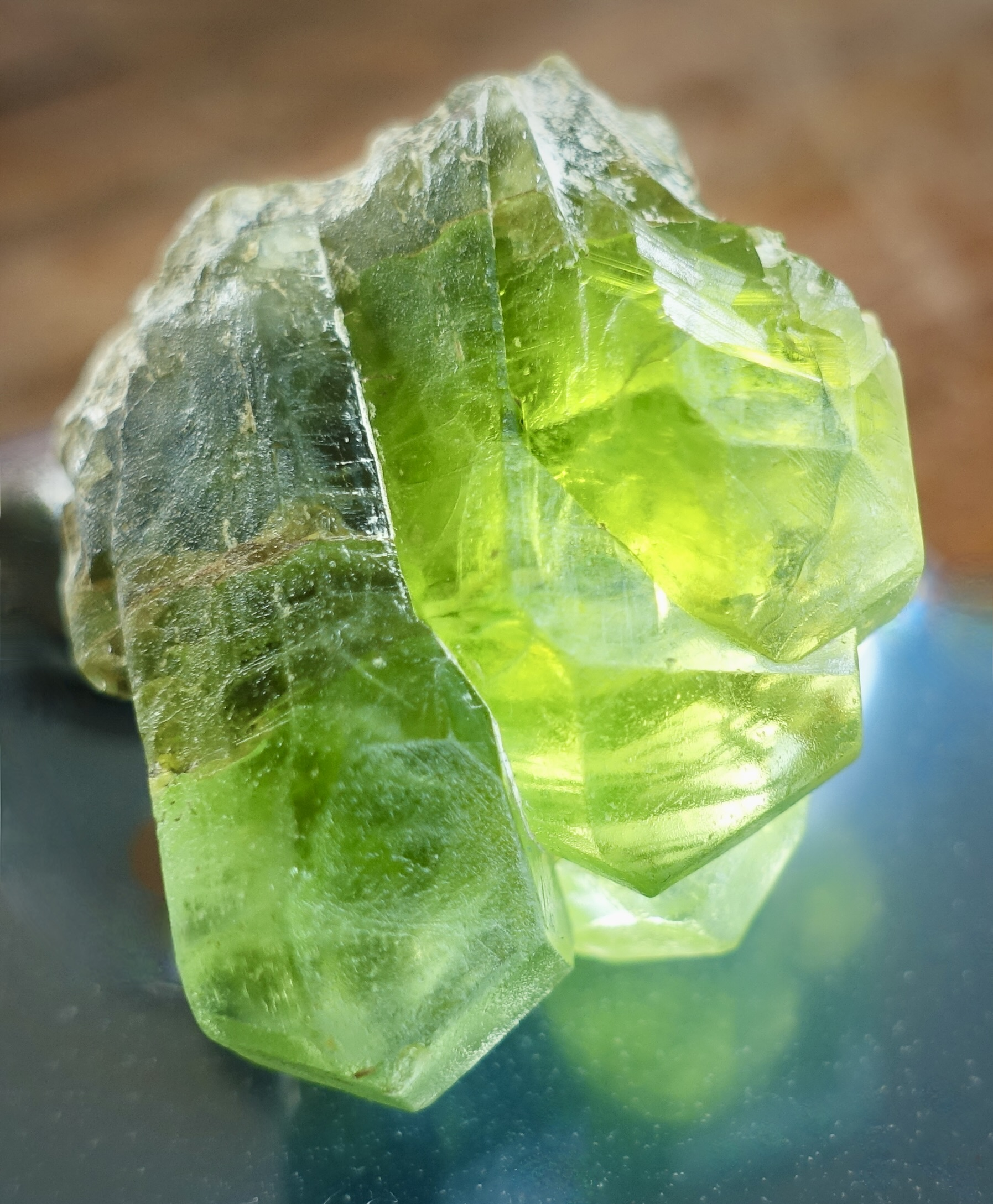
Peridot crystal

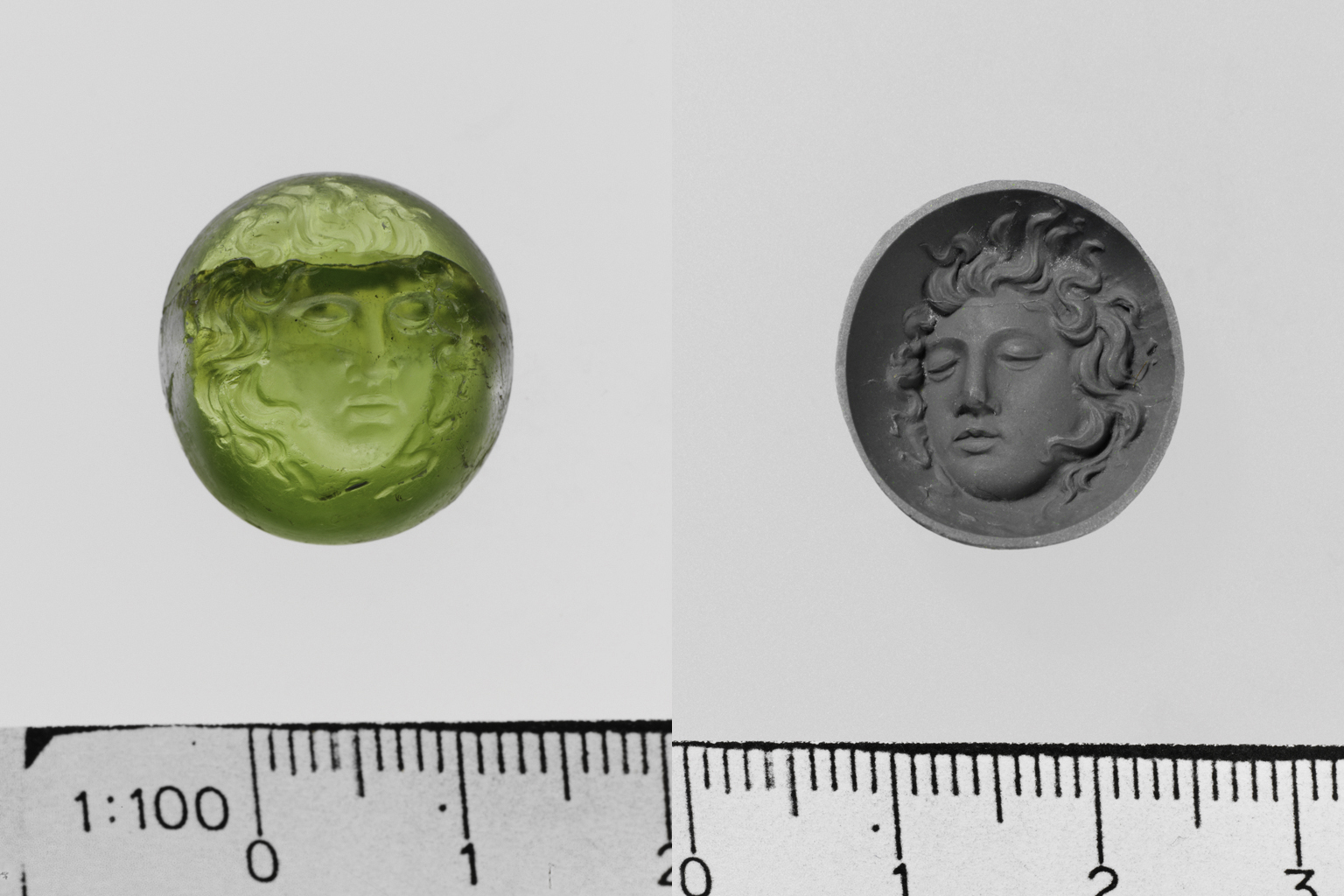
Roman peridot intaglio

Peridot - Hebrew פִּטְדָה piṭḏa, Greek τοπάζιον topazion, Latin topazius. The second stone of the priestly breastplate (Exodus 28:17, 39:19), representing Simeon; also the second stone in Ezekiel 28:13; the ninth foundation stone of the celestial Jerusalem (Rev. 21:20) and also mentioned in Job 28:19.

Hebrew piṭḏa and Greek topazion are likely related words, the term originating from an African language of the Red Sea region. The etymology remains obscure.

In the ancient world, peridot originated exclusively from Zabaragad Island in the Red Sea.

=== Sapphire ===
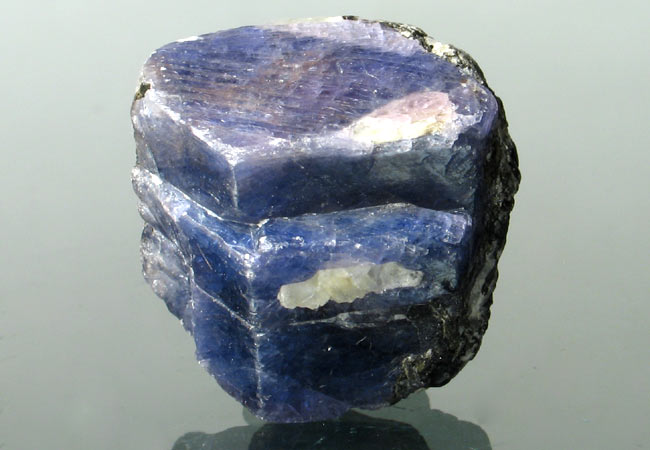
Sapphire

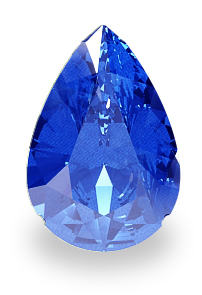
Sapphire

Sapphire - Greek ὑάκινθος hyakinthos; Vulg. hyacinthus; the eleventh stone of the foundation of the heavenly city (Revelation 21:20).

The genuine sapphire is a blue hyaline corundum and is composed of nearly pure alumina, its color resulting from the presence of iron oxide. Sapphire was obtained from India.

Lapis lazuli is frequently confused with sapphire in the interpretation of ancient texts, but sapphire was scarcely known before the Roman period and the ancients had distinct vocabulary for the gemstones.

=== Sardonyx ===
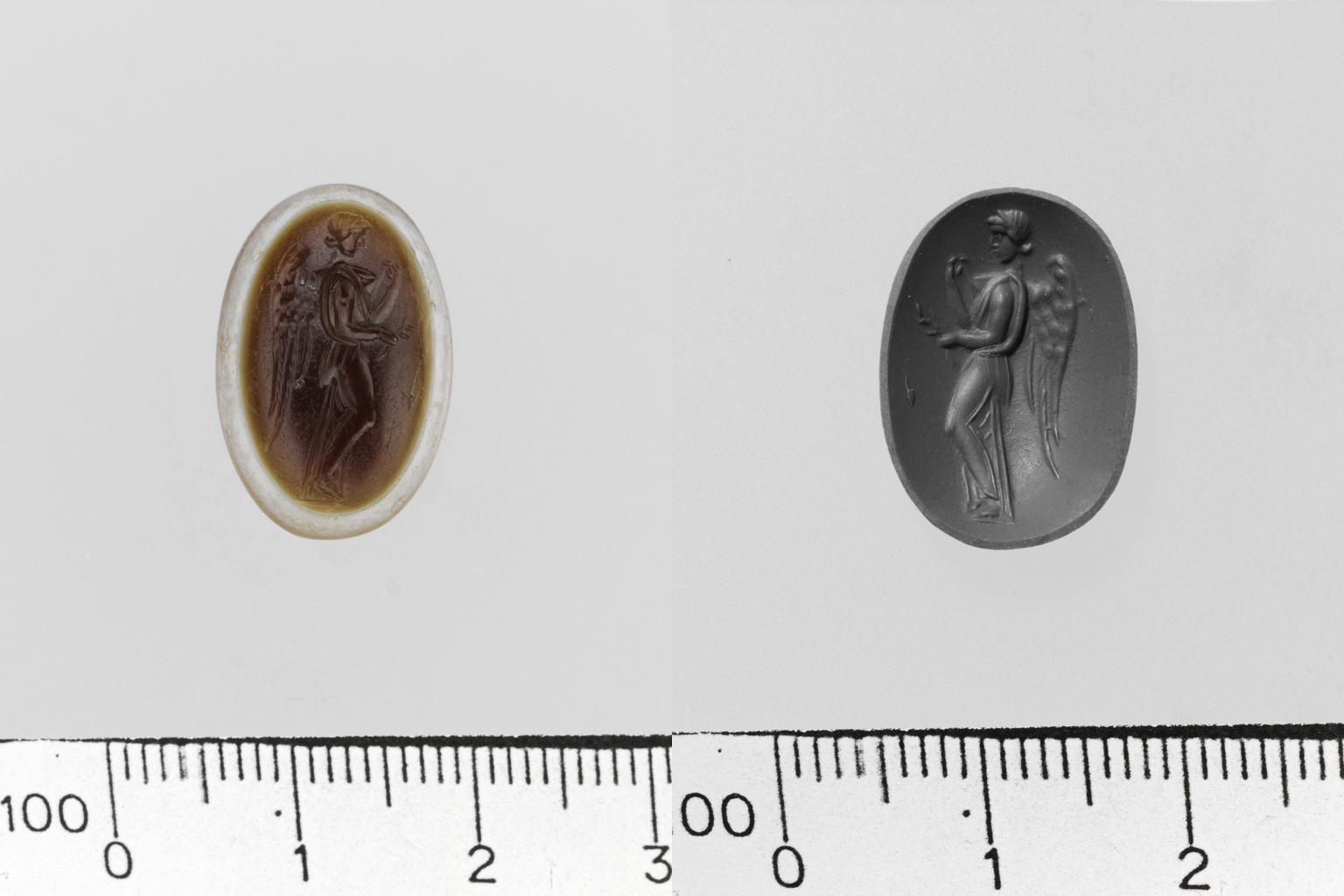
Roman intaglio, sardonyx.

Sardonyx - Under the name sardonyx, it comes fifth in Revelation 21:20. Sardonyx is technically a variety of onyx (see above), marked by red-and-white bands instead of black-and-white. Sardonyx began to be held in high esteem in Ancient Rome after Scipio Africanus began to wear one. Sardonyx was likely obtained from the same source as onyx, see above.

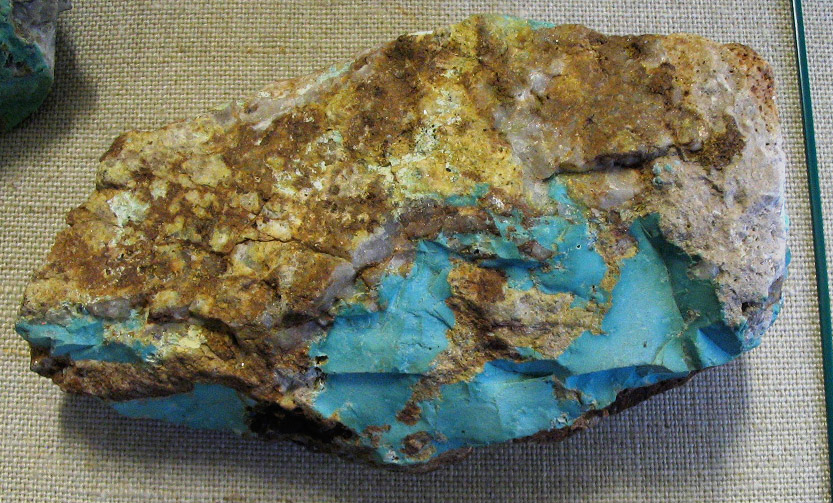
Rough turquoise on matrix

=== Turquoise ===
Turquoise - Hebrew נֹפֶךְ nophekh.

The Hebrew name nophekh must have been borrowed from the Ancient Egyptian term mfkꜢt also meaning "turquoise" before the supply of turquoise dried up. Turquoise was extracted by the Ancient Egyptians from mines at Serabit el-Khadim, which was closed in the 12th century BCE.

== See also ==
- Priestly breastplate
- List of plants in the Bible
