= Kerolite =

Phyllosilicate mineral

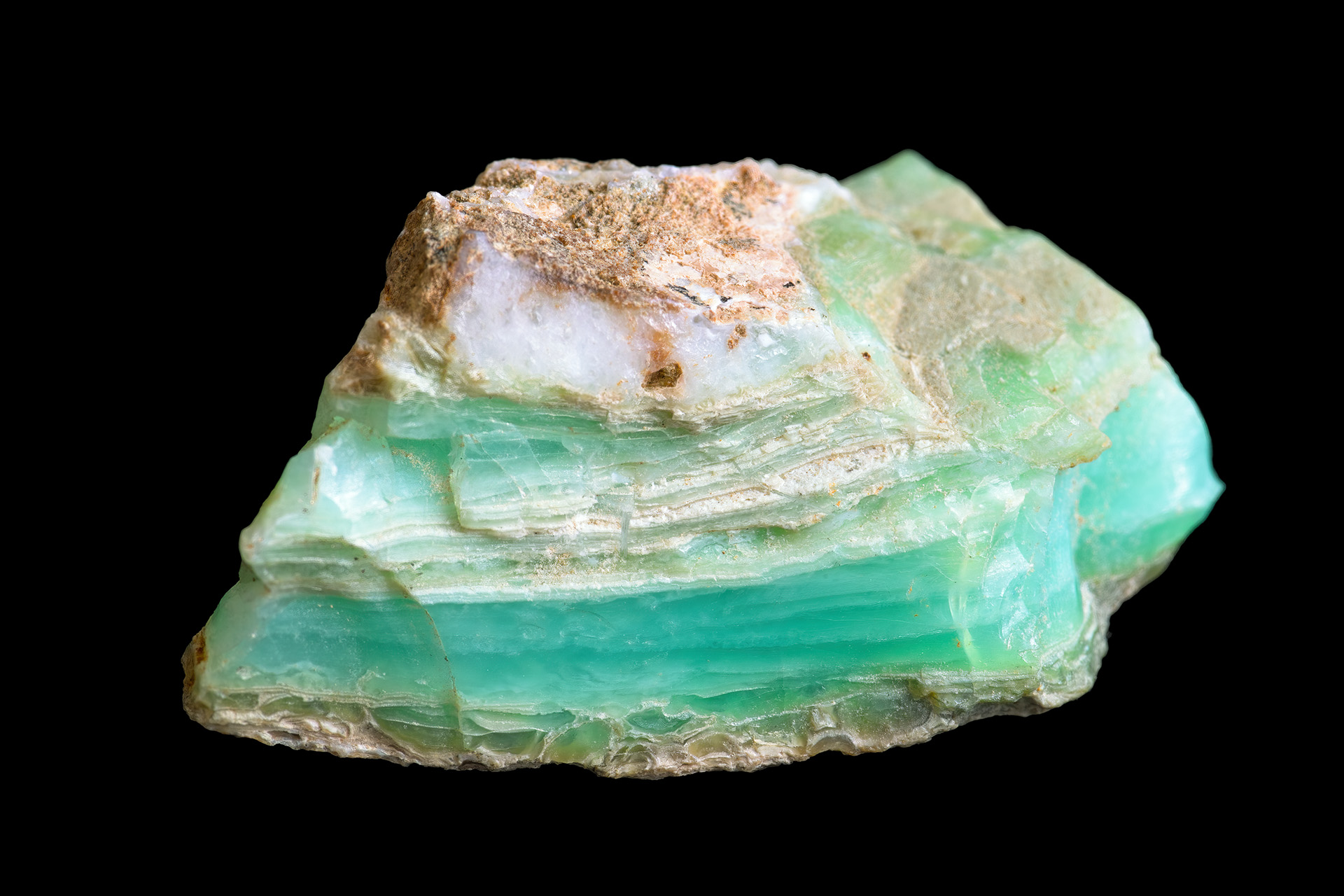
- Chrysoprase whose green coloring results from to the addition of kerolite

General
- Category: Phyllosilicate minerals
- Formula: (Mg,Ni)_{3}Si_{4}O_{10}(OH)_{2}·H_{2}O

Kerolite or cerolite is a metamorphic nickel bearing phyllosilicate mineral variety of talc, can be seen as a mixture of serpentine and saponite as well. It has the chemical formula (Mg,Ni)_{3}Si_{4}O_{10}(OH)_{2}·H_{2}O. It is often considered as a talc variety and it was discredited 1979.
