= Chrome chalcedony =

Green variety of chalcedony

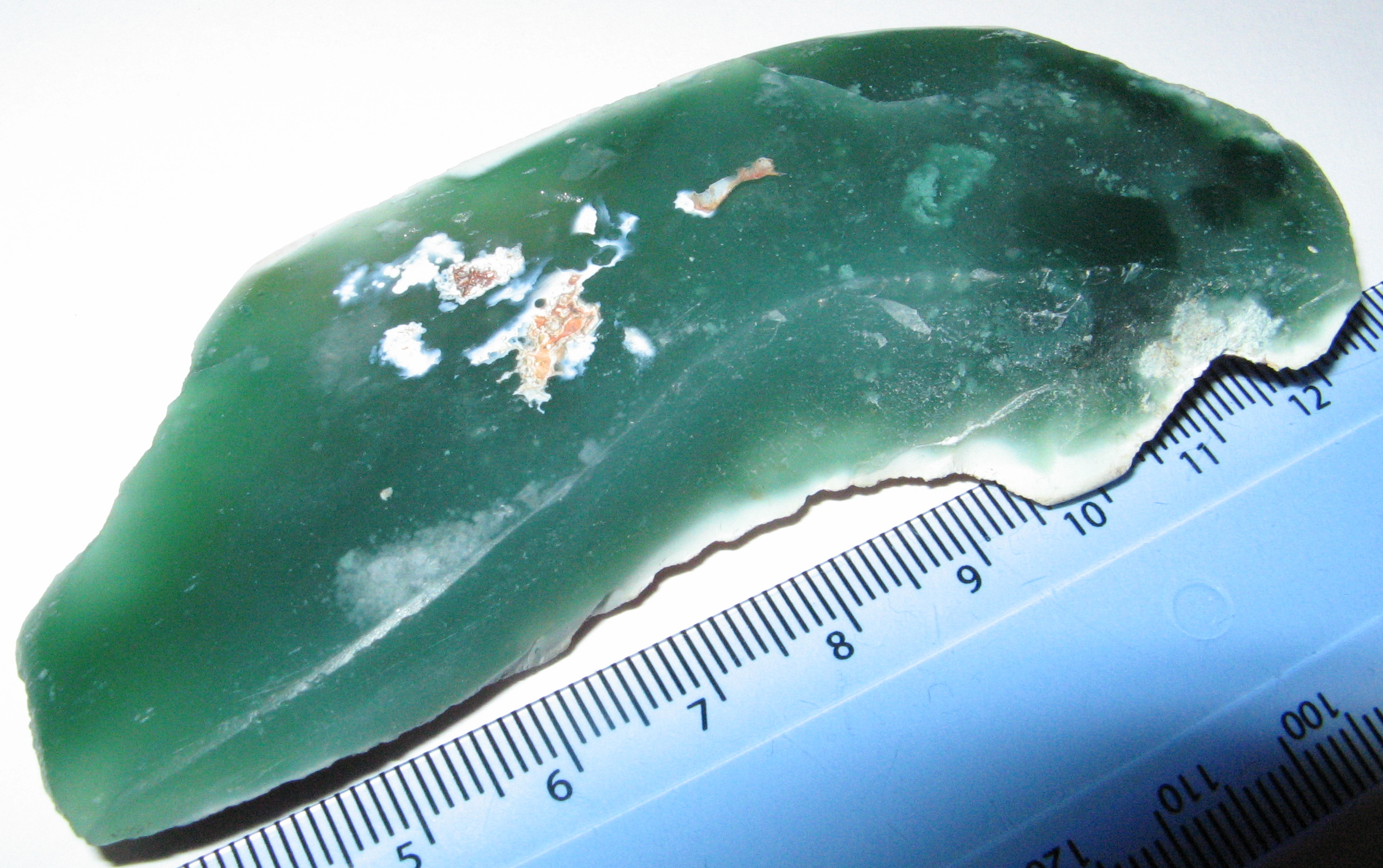
- Zimbabwean chrome chalcedony (known locally as mtorolite). Scale is in centimetres.

General
- Category: Tectosilicate minerals
- Group: Quartz group
- Formula: Silica (SiO_{2})
- IMA status: Variety of quartz (chalcedony)
- Crystal system: Trigonal (quartz), monoclinic (moganite)

Identification
- Formula mass: 60 g/mol
- Color: Emerald green
- Cleavage: Absent
- Fracture: Uneven, splintery, conchoidal
- Mohs scale hardness: 6–7
- Luster: Vitreous, dull, greasy, silky
- Streak: White
- Diaphaneity: Translucent
- Specific gravity: Usually 2.60, sometimes greater than 2.62

Chrome chalcedony is a green variety of the mineral chalcedony, colored by small quantities of chromium. Its name is derived from Mutorashanga, a small ferrochrome mining town in Zimbabwe where the mineral was discovered in the 1950s.

It is most commonly found in Zimbabwe, where it is known as Mtorolite, Mtorodite, or Matorolite. It is also marketed using the trade name, Aquaprase.

== Chemical composition ==
Chrome chalcedony is similar in appearance to the better known chrysoprase, but differs in that whilst chrome chalcedony is colored by chromium (as chromium(III) oxide), chrysoprase is colored by nickel. The two can be distinguished with a Chelsea color filter, as chrome chalcedony will appear red, whilst chrysoprase will appear green. Chrome chalcedony (unlike chrysoprase) may also contain tiny black specks of chromite.

Chrome chalcedony is (together with agate, carnelian, chrysoprase, heliotrope, onyx and others) a variety of chalcedony. This is a cryptocrystalline form of silica, consisting of fine intergrowths of the minerals quartz and moganite.

== Locality ==
Chrome chalcedony (known as mtorolite, mtorodite or matorolite) occurs in Zimbabwe, principally near to the mining town of Mtoroshanga, located on the Great Dyke geological feature. It has also been discovered in western Australia, the Balkans, Bolivia, Turkey and the Ural Mountains.

== Ancient history ==
Chrome chalcedony was widely used in jewellery and seals throughout the Roman Empire. The source of the mineral is unclear, as whilst Pliny the Elder described it as coming from India, no deposits have been found there. It may have come from Anatolia (in modern-day Turkey), where deposits are known to exist.

Chrome chalcedony disappeared from use sometime in the 2nd century. It was only rediscovered when the Zimbabwean deposits were found in the 1950s.
