= Chrysoprase =

Gemstone variety of chalcedony

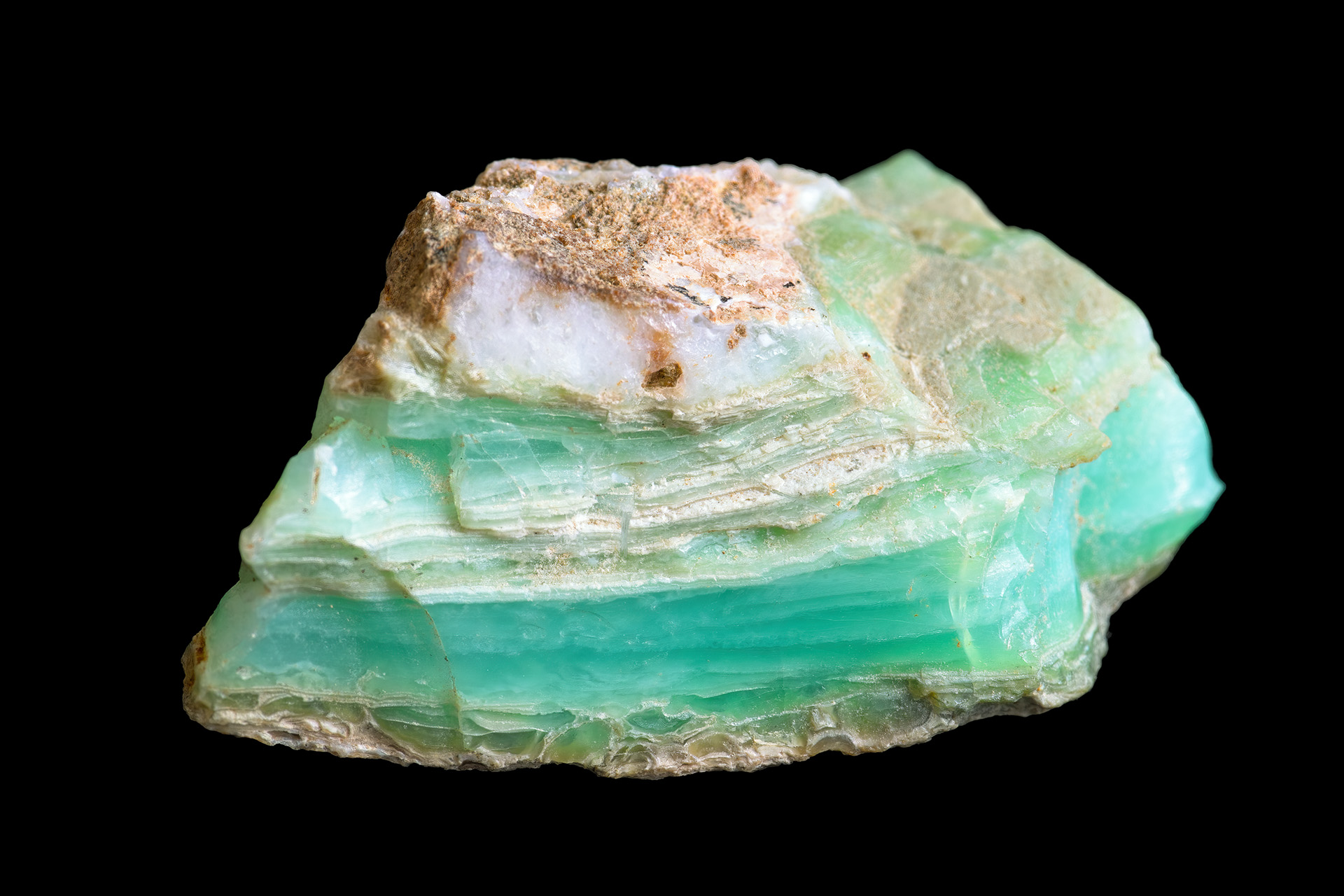
- Chrysoprase (Poland)

General
- Category: Tectosilicate minerals
- Group: Quartz group
- Formula: SiO_{2}
- IMA status: Variety of quartz (chalcedony)
- Crystal system: Trigonal (quartz), monoclinic (moganite)

Identification
- Color: Olive to applegreen
- Crystal habit: Microcrystalline aggregates
- Cleavage: None
- Fracture: Conchoidal, granular
- Tenacity: Brittle
- Mohs scale hardness: 6.0–7.0
- Luster: Greasy, waxy
- Diaphaneity: Nearly opaque to nearly transparent
- Specific gravity: 2.651–2.91
- Birefringence: 0.004–0.009
- Dispersion: None
- Ultraviolet fluorescence: None

Chrysoprase, chrysophrase or chrysoprasus is a gemstone variety of chalcedony (a cryptocrystalline form of silica) that contains small quantities of nickel. Its color is normally apple-green, but varies from turquoise-like cyan to deep green. The darker varieties of chrysoprase are also referred to as prase. (However, the term prase is also used to describe chlorite-included quartz, and to a certain extent is a color-descriptor, rather than a rigorously defined mineral variety.)

Chrysoprase is cryptocrystalline, which means that it is composed of crystals so fine that they cannot be seen as distinct particles under normal magnification. This sets it apart from rock crystal, amethyst, citrine, and the other varieties of crystalline quartz. Other members of the cryptocrystalline silica family include agate, carnelian, and onyx. Unlike many non-transparent silica minerals, it is the color of chrysoprase, rather than any pattern of markings, that makes it desirable. The word chrysoprase comes from the Greek χρυσός chrysos meaning 'gold' and πράσινον prasinon, meaning 'green'.

Unlike emerald which owes its green color to the presence of chromium, the color of chrysoprase is due to trace amounts of nickel compounds in the form of very small inclusions. The nickel reportedly occurs as different silicates, like kerolite or pimelite (not NiO mineral, bunsenite, as was reported before). Chrysoprase results from the deep weathering or lateritization of nickeliferous serpentinites or other ultramafic ophiolite rocks. In the Australian deposits, chrysoprase occurs as veins and nodules with brown goethite and other iron oxides in the magnesite-rich saprolite below an iron and silica cap.

As with all forms of chalcedony, chrysoprase has a hardness of 6 to 7 on the Mohs hardness scale and a conchoidal fracture like flint.

== Sources ==
The best known sources of chrysoprase are Indonesia, Queensland, Western Australia, Haneti Tanzania, Germany, Poland, Russia, Arizona, California, and Brazil. Deposits in central Tanzania have been in constant production since 1986. The chrysoprase and nickel silicate ore deposit in Szklary, Lower Silesia, Poland, was probably the biggest European chrysoprase occurrence and possibly also the biggest in the world.

== Fashion ==
Chrysoprase was fashionable during the 1980s.

== Similar minerals ==
A very similar mineral to chrysoprase is chrome chalcedony, in which the color is provided by chromium rather than nickel.

== See also ==
- Chalcedony
