= Chelsea filter =

Optical filter used for identifying coloured stones

In gemmology, a Chelsea filter is a dichromatic optical filter used for identifying coloured stones.

== History ==
The "chelsea" filter was originally devised by Anderson and Payne in 1934 of the Gem testing Laboratory of the London Chamber of Commerce & Industry. The filter was devised with the collaboration of gemmology students of the Chelsea College of Science and Technology where Basil Anderson was an instructor for the Gemmological Association of Great Britain. Since this filter allows transmission of both deep-red wavelengths around 690 nanometres and yellow-green wavelengths, around 570 nanometres, that matched emerald's emission and absorption characteristics, this filter was initially recommended to assist the discrimination between natural emerald and its simulants such as green glass, tourmaline, peridot, etc. This discrimination is possible because chromium (containing iron) and vanadium-free emeralds emit a red fluorescence when illuminated by white light that also has a content of ultraviolet wavelengths.

Synthetic emeralds were commercially introduced around 1940. These produce the same pink-red response as some emeralds through the Chelsea filter. However, although this filter is unable to predictably discriminate between natural and synthetic emerald, it has been subsequently found capable of distinguishing aquamarine, blue topaz, and their blue synthetic spinel simulants, because unlike natural gemstones, blue cobalt-containing synthetic spinels emit a red fluorescence under white light.

Chelsea Colour Filter is a UK Trademark held by The Gemmological Association of Great Britain (UK Trademark Registration No. 1473951).

== Use ==
Hold the filter an inch or two from the eye. Light the stone with a strong incandescent light bulb or torch, not LED. The stone may appear to change colour. The filter must be held near to the eye but there is no need to hold the filter close to the stone, even items in showcases can be examined providing they are lit by strong lights.

Chelsea Filters were also used to help separate aquamarine and natural zircon from synthetic flame-fusion spinel (used extensively in "birthstone" jewelry), as both of the former absorb the red portion of the spectrum and the synthetic spinel did not.

== See also ==
- Infrared filter
- Optical filter
