= Beekite =

Form of chalcedony

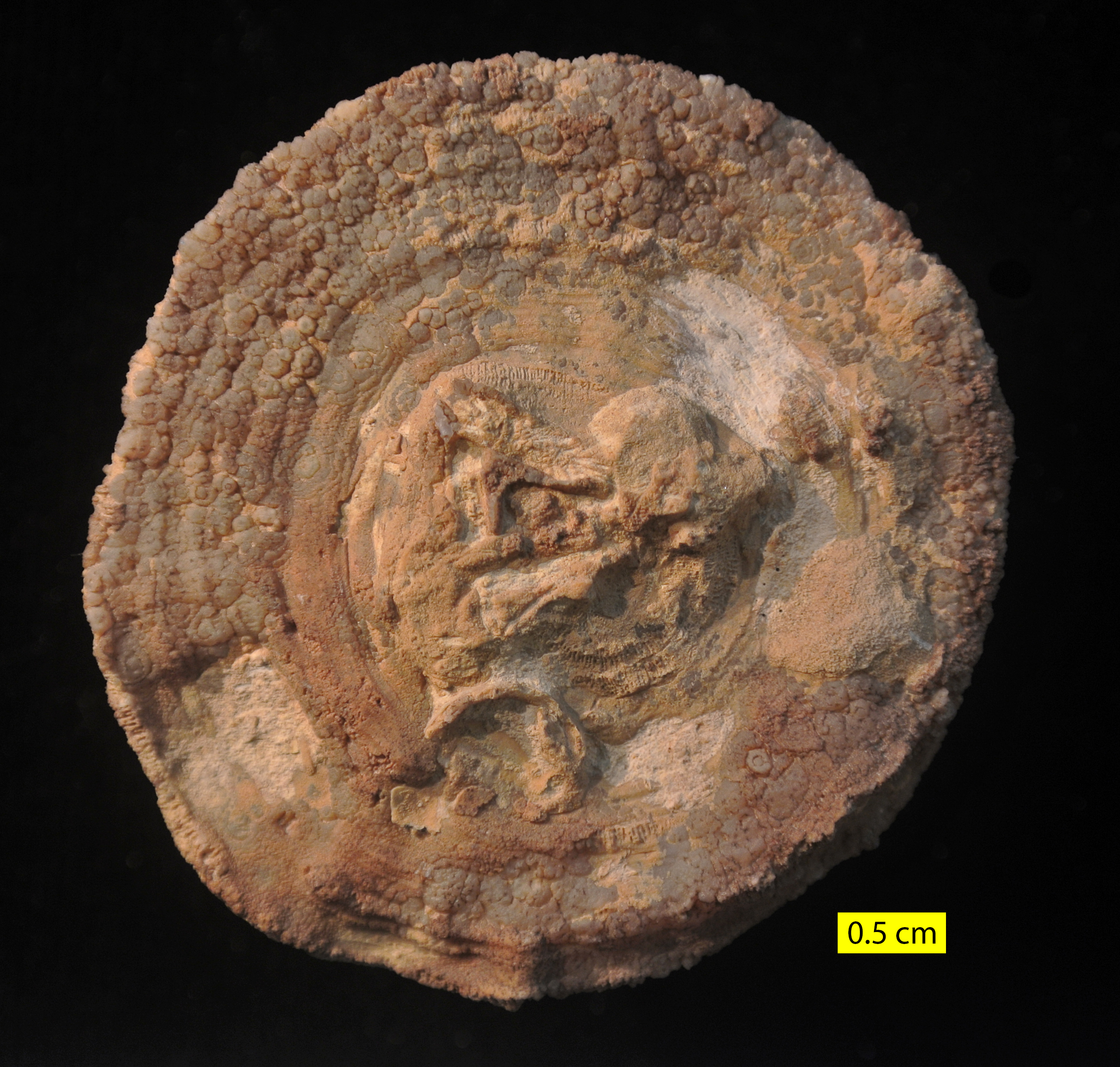
- Base of the scleractinian coral Microsolena showing beekite rings; Middle Jurassic of southern Israel.

General
- Category: Tectosilicate minerals
- Group: Quartz group
- Formula: SiO_{2}
- IMA status: Variety of quartz (chalcedony)

Beekite is a distinctive form of chalcedony usually associated with silica replacing carbonate minerals in fossils (e.g., the top part of the coral illustrated).

Beekite, recognised as small, concentric rings (cylinders, ellipsoids, or spheres in 3D) of microcrystalline quartz, is recorded as first brought to geologists’ attention by Henry Beeke, probably from studies around Torbay. Early studies were reported by Thomas McKenny Hughes, in Devon, and R. Etheridge in Australia.

A study of the taphonomy of silicified fossils (especially brachiopods) in Devon concluded beekite resulted from the aerobic decomposition of organic matter in an environment with a limited supply of silica during early diagenesis. Elsewhere, beekite has been compared to silcrete, indicating a break in sedimentation, where it occurs as encrustations on clasts of carbonate rock in the Palaeocene alluvial fan deposits of central Anatolia.
