= Henry Beeke =

English historian, theologian, writer on taxation and finance and botanist

- Born: 6 January 1751; Kingsteignton, Devon, England
- Died: 9 March 1837 (aged 86); Torquay, Devon, England
- Education: Corpus Christi College, Oxford
- Occupations: Historian and theologian
- Title: Regius Professor of Modern History
- Term: 1801–1813
- Predecessor: Thomas Nowell
- Successor: Edward Nares

Henry Beeke (6 January 1751 – 9 March 1837) was an English historian, theologian, writer on taxation and finance, and botanist. He is credited with helping to introduce the world's first modern income tax.

== Career ==
Beeke was elected a scholar of Corpus Christi, Oxford in May 1769. He gained a Bachelor of Arts degree in 1773, a Master of Arts degree in 1776, a Bachelor of Divinity in 1785, and a Doctorate in Divinity in 1800. In 1775 Beeke became a fellow of Oriel College and was Junior Proctor of the university in 1784. Beeke was Regius Professor of Modern History between 1801 and 1813.

Beeke was vicar of the University Church of St Mary the Virgin, Oxford in 1782, rector of Ufton Nervet, Berkshire in 1789, Dean of Bristol in 1813, and vicar of Weare in 1819.

Beeke gained a reputation as a fiscal expert following his 1799 Observations on the produce of the income tax, and on its proportion to the whole income of Great Britain, which was expanded and reprinted in 1800. His work on taxation prompted Pitt the Younger to introduce the first income tax in 1799 in order to fund the British effort in the French Revolutionary Wars. Beeke's unpublished manuscripts and correspondence also show his wider interests in economics.

Beekite, a distinctive form of chalcedony which occurs in the preservation of fossils by silicification, was named to honour Beeke.

Beeke was very interested in botany. He made contributions to Lysons' Magna Britannia records, and corresponded with Sir James Edward Smith, a fellow and first president of the Linnean Society of London. Beeke is credited as the binomial author of at least one plant species, Lotus pilosus Beeke, first described and published in Turner and Dillwyn's Botanical Guide. This species was later thought to be Lotus uliginosus Schkuhr, which is now settled as a synonym of Lotus pedunculatus Cav., a kind of trefoil.

Beeke died at Torquay on 9 March 1837.
