= Edward Rolle =

English author, poet, and Anglican vicar

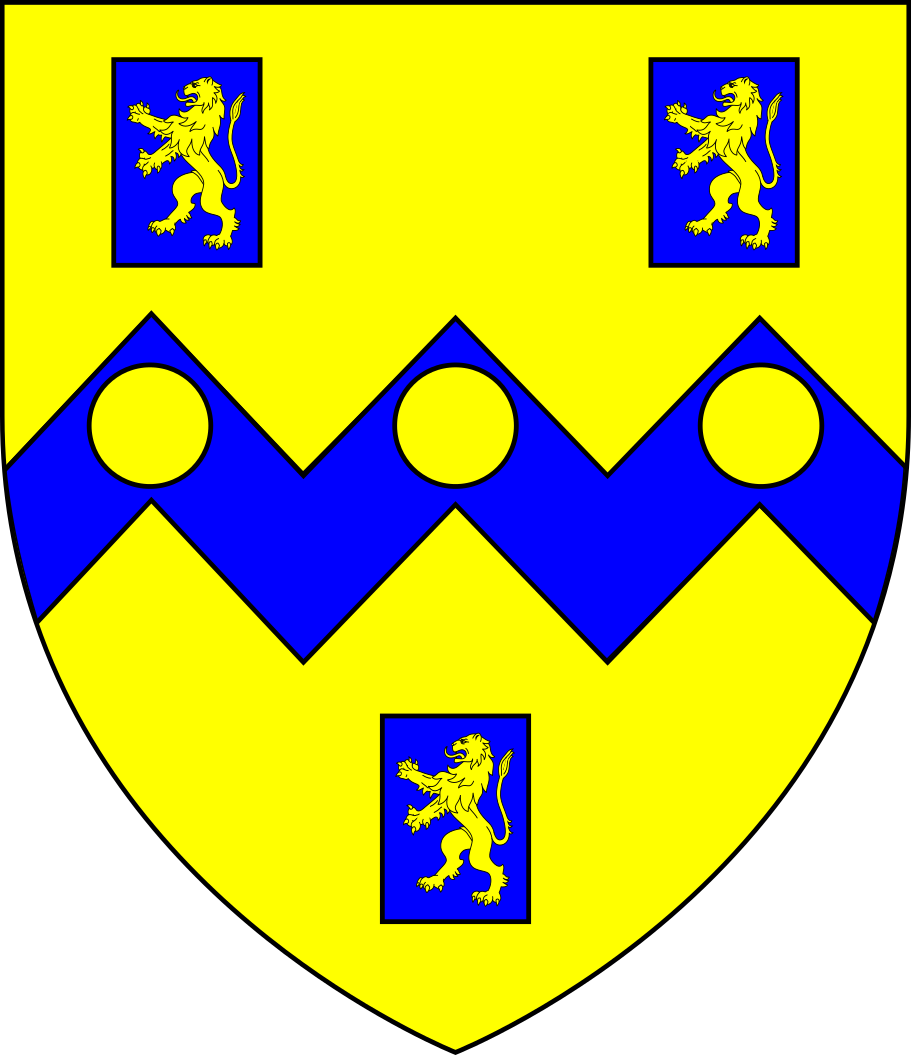
Arms of Rolle: Or, on a fesse dancetté between three billets azure each charged with a lion rampant of the first three bezants

Edward Rolle (27 April 1703 – 30 June 1791), known as the Captain or Captain Rolle, was an English author, poet, and Anglican vicar. Rolle was one of a little group of New College men whose essays in verse enjoyed a temporary existence in miscellany, including fellow Wykehamists Christopher Pitt, Edward Young, and Joseph Spence.

== Early life and education ==
Edward Rolle was born on 27 April 1703 and baptised on 7 May 1703 in Meeth, Devon. He was the youngest son of Robert Rolle of Meeth, a great-great grandson of George Rolle and member of the wealthy Rolle family of Devon, (Note: The Rolles would become the biggest landowners in the West Country under John Rolle, 1st Baron Rolle, as disclosed regarding the landholding of Mark Rolle, his adoptive heir, in the Return of Owners of Land, 1873 survey.) and Margaret, daughter of John Martyn, who married in 1699.

Rolle attended Winchester College and matriculated from New College, Oxford on 10 July 1723; he was a fellow of New College from 1723 to 1755. Rolle earned his Bachelor of Arts in 1727, his Master of Arts in 1730, and his Bachelor of Divinity in 1758. While at New College, he held a sermon on The Rights of Primogeniture in the New College Chapel, as mentioned in John Mulso's Letters to Gilbert White.

The younger of the two, Rolle acted, more than once, as Joseph Spence's deputy in the Poetry-Professorship at Oxford.

== Travels ==
Published in the Egerton Collection are several letters of correspondence between Rolle and Joseph Spence during the latter's three travels abroad, from December 1730 to July 1733, and from May 1737 to November 1741 (with a break). A letter from Spence to his mother Mirabella Spence on 16 November 1732 details the extent to which Rolle had, through the interest of his cousin Henry Rolle M.P., got "a pretty little living... which he can hold with New College. 'Tis in Devonshire, within three miles of the place where he was born, and there's a pretty little newfashion'd house upon it."

In another letter to his mother dated from Florence, 7 November 1740, Spence gave an amusing description of Rolle: "A Lazy, Lath-gutted Fellow, with a Wezel-Face. He's thin and made for business. He shou'd write as fast as a Greyhound runs. I always thought he'd come to little or nothing, and so he's like to do if he grows much thinner."

Before earning his Bachelor of Divinity in the summer of 1753, Rolle himself was abroad: travelling to Venice, Padua, and Florence, he had crossed the Alps and arrived at Mainz; Rolle was then preparing to descend the Rhine to Spa and Amsterdam. His intention was to go through Holland and so visit Brussels and Calais. His companion, Mr. W., was paying expenses. These travels are described by Rolle in a letter to Spence on pages 443 to 446 in Spence's own Observations, Anecdotes, and Characters, of Books and Men. Two other letters by Rolle, written from his Devonian benefice to Spence, are in the same volume.

Rolle and Spence were both friends of the Rev. Christopher Pitt, translator of Virgil, whom they visited at his parsonage house of Pimperne, near Blandford, in Dorset. A letter from Pitt on 4 January 1736 speaks of his imitations of Horace, including one addressed to Rolle, which had been printed.

A letter from Sophia Bentinck, Duchess of Kent to Rolle refers to painter Jacopo Amigoni, whom she commissioned, and suggests that King George II also sat to him, but there is no corroborating evidence for this statement.

== Church career ==
In 1755, Rolle was nominated by Oxford's New College to the rectory of Berwick Saint John in Wiltshire, which he accepted. In 1758, he was appointed to the vicarage of Moorlinch in Somerset and he was collated on 9 May 1771 to the prebendal stall of Yetminster Secunda in Salisbury Cathedral. These three preferments he held until his death.

In 1761, Rolle was offered the living of Sarsden in Oxfordshire, wherein he would exchange the rectory of Berwick Saint John for another New College benefice with which it would be tenable. The suggestion came to nothing and Rolle remained at Berwick, retaining his faculties until the end of his long life. Until his wife's death, in 1788, when his curates began assisting him, Rolle had for thirty years discharged all the duties of the parish without a prolonged holiday. A manuscript volume in the care of a future rector exhibits Rolle as a devoted clergyman, noting customs of the place, his services to the church, and his role in educating the village children.

== Personal life ==
On 22 September 1755 at the age of 52, Rolle married Elizabeth Eyre in Wootton Saint Lawrence. She died on 21 November 1788 at the age of 68, and was buried at Berwick Saint John on 28 November. Rolle himself died on 30 June 1791 at the age of 88, and was buried there on 7 July. A large lias tombstone near the north door of the church records their names. Rolle erected a cenotaph for his wife and himself on the east wall of the south choir-aisle in 1789. The bells of the church were recast by him in 1767, and a new parsonage house for the benefice was built after his death, partly with money from his estate.

Rolle was one of the three executors to Joseph Spence's will in 1768.

== Works ==
- The Duty of Employing one's Self. An EPISTLE.
- LIFE burthensome, because we know not how to use it. An EPISTLE.
- On SCRIBLING against GENIUS. An EPISTLE.
- The POWER of POETRY.
- To a Young Lady with FONTENELLE'S Plurality of Worlds.

Of the seven poems under Joseph Spence's name which are reprinted from the Oxford University sets of verses in Nichols's collection of poetry, the second pair were by Rolle.
