= Onyx =

Black and white variety of agate

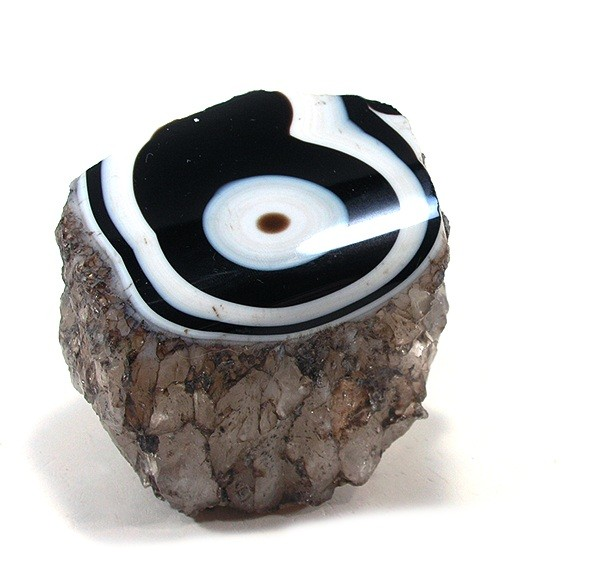
- Onyx with concentric banding

General
- Category: Tectosilicate minerals
- Group: Quartz group
- Formula: SiO_{2} (silicon dioxide)
- IMA status: Variety of quartz (chalcedony)
- Crystal system: Trigonal (quartz), Monoclinic (moganite)

Identification
- Formula mass: 60.08 g/mol
- Color: Black and white; red to brown with black or white (sardonyx)
- Cleavage: None
- Fracture: Uneven, conchoidal
- Mohs scale hardness: 6.5–7
- Luster: Vitreous, silky
- Streak: White
- Diaphaneity: Translucent
- Specific gravity: 2.55–2.70
- Optical properties: Uniaxial/+
- Refractive index: 1.530–1.543

Onyx is a typically black-and-white banded variety of agate, a silicate mineral. The bands can also be monochromatic with alternating light and dark bands. Sardonyx is a variety with red to brown bands alternated with black or white bands. The name "onyx" is also frequently used for level-banded (parallel-banded) agates, but in proper usage it refers to color pattern not band structure. Onyx, as a descriptive term, has also been incorrectly applied to parallel-banded varieties of alabaster, marble, calcite, obsidian, and opal, and misleadingly to materials with contorted banding, such as "cave onyx" and "Mexican onyx".

== Etymology ==
Onyx comes through Latin (of the same spelling), from the Ancient Greek ὄνυξ (onyx), meaning 'claw' or 'fingernail'. Onyx with pink and white bands can sometimes resemble a fingernail. The English word "nail" is cognate with the Greek word.

== Varieties ==
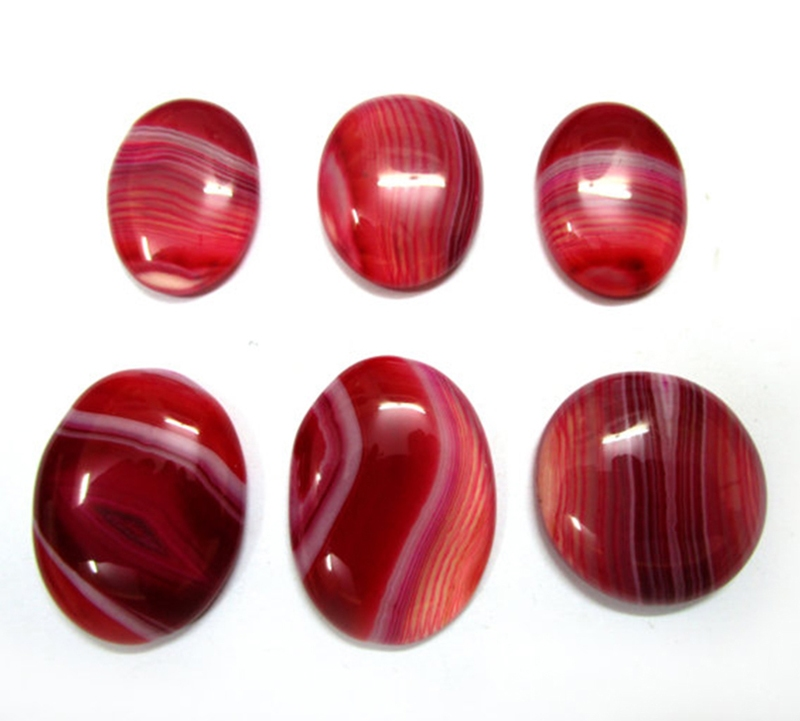
Cabochons of red onyx, also called sardonyx

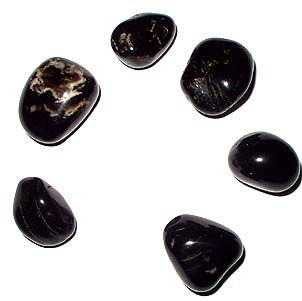
Black onyx with white streaks

Onyx is formed of chalcedony bands in alternating colors. It is cryptocrystalline, consisting of fine intergrowths of the silica minerals quartz and moganite. Its bands are parallel, unlike the more chaotic banding that often occurs in agates.

Sardonyx is a variant in which the colored bands are sard (shades of red) rather than black. Black onyx is perhaps the most famous variety, but it is not as common as onyx with colored bands. Several artificial treatments have been used since ancient times to produce the black color in "black onyx" and the reds and yellows in sardonyx. Most "black onyx" on the market is artificially colored.

== Imitations and treatments ==
The name has also commonly been used to label other banded materials, such as banded calcite found in Mexico, India, and other places, and often carved, polished, and sold. This material is much softer than true onyx and more readily available. The majority of carved items sold as "onyx" today are this carbonate material.

Artificial onyx types have also been produced from common chalcedony and plain agates. The first-century naturalist Pliny the Elder described these techniques used in Roman times. Treatments for producing black and other colors include soaking or boiling chalcedony in sugar solutions, then treating with sulfuric or hydrochloric acid to carbonize sugars which had been absorbed into the top layers of the stone. These techniques are still used, as well as other dyeing treatments, and most so-called "black onyx" sold is artificially treated. In addition to dye treatments, heating and treatment with nitric acid have been used to lighten or eliminate undesirable colors.

== Geographic occurrence ==
Onyx can be found in various regions of the world, including Mexico, Greece, Yemen, Uruguay, Argentina, Australia, Brazil, Canada, China, Czech Republic, Germany, Pakistan, India, Indonesia, Madagascar, the UK, and various states in the US.

== Historical use ==
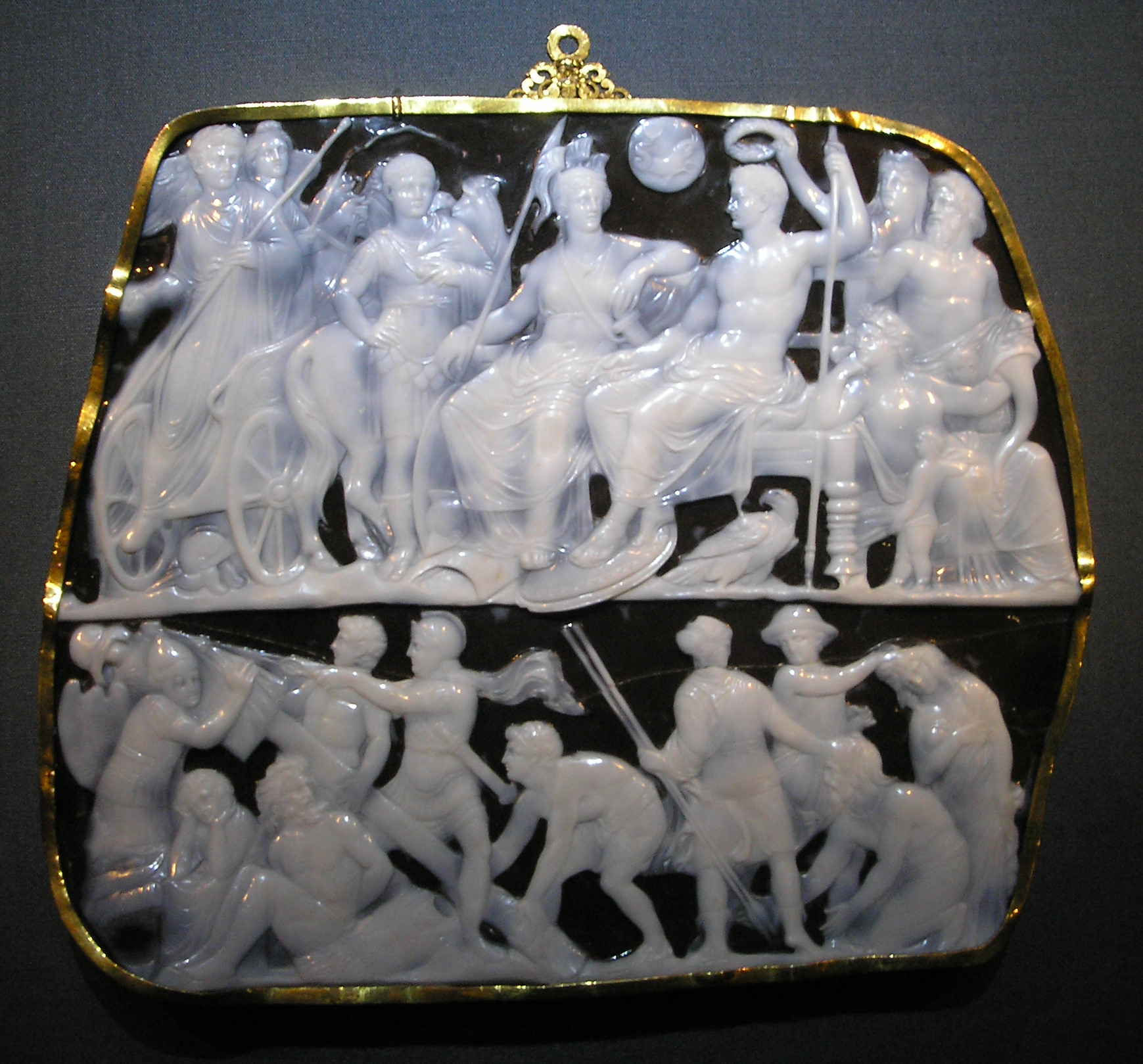
The Gemma Augustea is a Roman cameo produced 9–12 AD and carved in a two-layered onyx gem (19 × 23 cm).

It has a long history of use for hardstone carving and jewelry, where it is usually cut as a cabochon or into beads. It has also been used for intaglio and hardstone cameo engraved gems, where the bands make the image contrast with the background. Some onyx is natural but much of the material in commerce is produced by the staining of agate.

Onyx was used in Egypt as early as the Second Dynasty to make bowls and other pottery items. Use of sardonyx appears in the art of Minoan Crete, notably from the archaeological recoveries at Knossos.

Brazilian green onyx was often used as plinths for art deco sculptures created in the 1920s and 1930s. The German sculptor Ferdinand Preiss used Brazilian green onyx for the base on the majority of his chryselephantine sculptures. Green onyx was also used for trays and pin dishes—produced mainly in Austria—often with small bronze animals or figures attached.

Onyx is mentioned in the Bible many times. Sardonyx (onyx in which white layers alternate with sard—a brownish color) is mentioned in the Bible as well.

Onyx was known to the ancient Greeks and Romans. The first-century naturalist Pliny the Elder described both types of onyx and various artificial treatment techniques in his Naturalis Historia.

Slabs of onyx (from the Atlas Mountains) were famously used by Mies van der Rohe in Villa Tugendhat at Brno (completed 1930) to create a shimmering semi-translucent interior wall.

=== Culture ===
The ancient Romans entered battle carrying amulets of sardonyx engraved with Mars, the god of war. This was assumed to bestow courage in battle. In Renaissance Europe, wearing sardonyx was assumed to bestow eloquence. A traditional Persian assumption is that it helped with epilepsy. Sardonyx was traditionally used by English midwives to ease childbirth by laying it between the breasts of the mother.

== See also ==
- List of minerals
- Chalcedony – Microcrystalline or cryptocrystalline form of silica
- Gemstone – Piece of mineral crystal used to make jewelry
- Jasper – Chalcedony variety colored by iron oxide
- Birthstone – Gemstone representing a person's birth month
