= Carnelian (color) =

Reddish-brown color

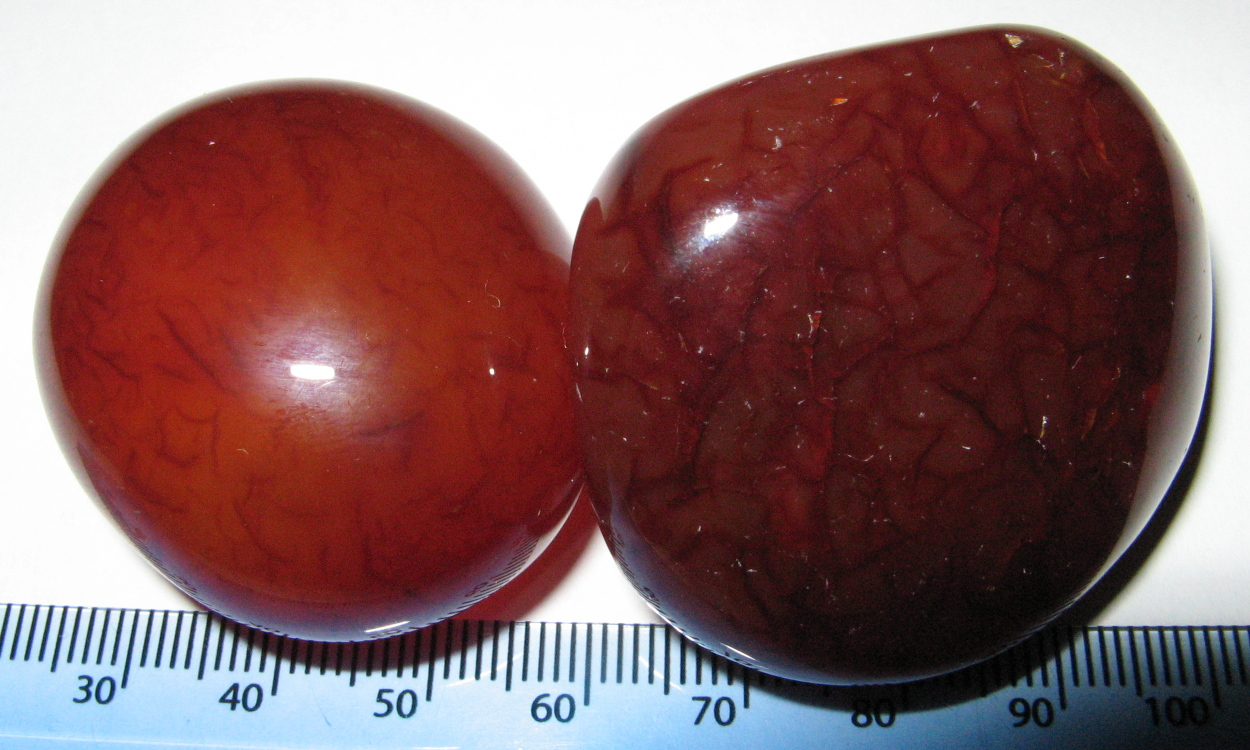
- Polished pebbles of the mineral carnelian

Color coordinates
- Hex triplet: #B31B1B
- sRGB^{B} (r, g, b): (179, 27, 27)
- CMYK^{H} (c, m, y, k): (0, 100, 79, 20)
- HSV (h, s, v): (0°, 85%, 70%)
- CIELCh_{uv} (L, C, h): (39, 115, 12°)
- Source: Cornell University
- ISCC–NBS descriptor: Vivid red
- B: Normalized to [0–255] (byte); H: Normalized to [0–100] (hundred)

Carnelian is a color named after the carnelian variety of the mineral chalcedony. This semi-precious gemstone is noted for its rich shade of reddish-brown.

The first recorded use of Carnelian as a color name in English was in 1899. The color used by Cornell University is referred to as Cornelian (an alternate spelling of the mineral carnelian) in the World Almanac of 1892 and the Living Church Annual and Whittaker's Churchman's Almanac of 1896.

== Carnelian in culture ==
=== School colors ===
- The official school colors of Cornell University are carnelian and white.

=== Buildings ===
- The Carnelian Room was a luxury restaurant that was once located on the 52nd (top) floor of the 555 California Street Building, formerly the Bank of America Center, in San Francisco, California. The restaurant was so named because 555 California Street is a building whose outer cladding is composed of carnelian colored granite. The restaurant went out of business on 31 December 2009 due to the 2008 financial crisis and the Great Recession. In 2013, the space the restaurant occupied was leased by video game company Supercell.

=== Business ===
- In 1898, Herberton Williams, a Campbell's executive, convinced the company to adopt a carnelian red and bright white color scheme, because he was taken by the crisp carnelian red color of the Cornell University football team's uniforms.

=== Sports ===
- Carnelian is the main color of the Los Angeles Angels of Anaheim Major League Baseball (MLB) franchise.
