= Carnelian =

Red-orange chalcedony variety

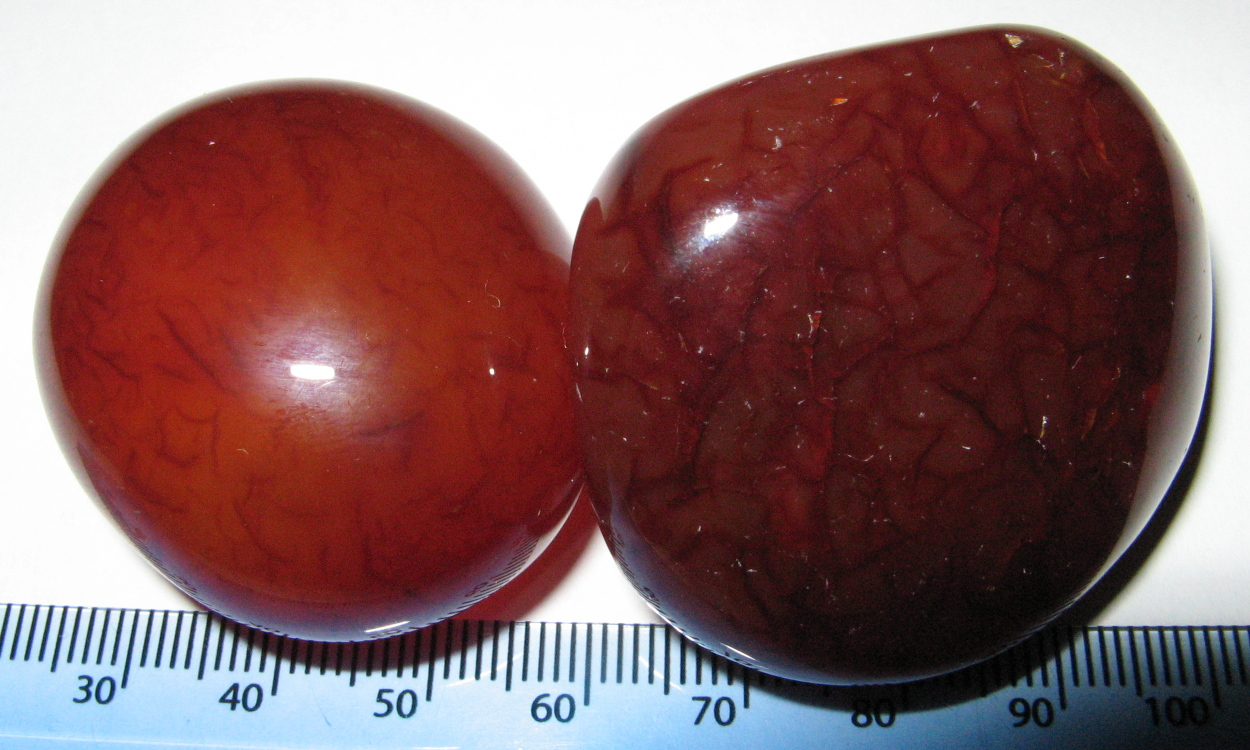

General
- Category: Tectosilicate minerals
- Group: Quartz group
- Formula: SiO_{2} (silicon dioxide)
- IMA status: Variety of quartz (chalcedony)
- Crystal system: Trigonal (quartz), monoclinic (moganite)

Identification
- Formula mass: 60 g/mol
- Color: Reddish, orange, brownish
- Cleavage: Absent
- Fracture: Uneven, splintery, conchoidal
- Mohs scale hardness: 6.5–7.0
- Luster: Waxy to resinous
- Streak: White
- Diaphaneity: Translucent to opaque
- Specific gravity: 2.58–2.64
- Optical properties: Uniaxial +
- Refractive index: 1.535–1.539
- Birefringence: 0.003–0.009

Carnelian (also spelled cornelian) is a brownish-red mineral commonly used as a semiprecious stone. Similar to carnelian is sard, which is generally harder and darker; the difference is not rigidly defined, and the two names are often used interchangeably. Both carnelian and sard are varieties of the silica mineral chalcedony colored by impurities of iron oxide. The color can vary greatly, ranging from pale orange to an intense almost-black coloration. Significant localities include Yanacodo, Peru and Ratnapura, Sri Lanka. It has been found in Indonesia, Brazil, India, Iran, Russia (Siberia), and Germany.

== History ==
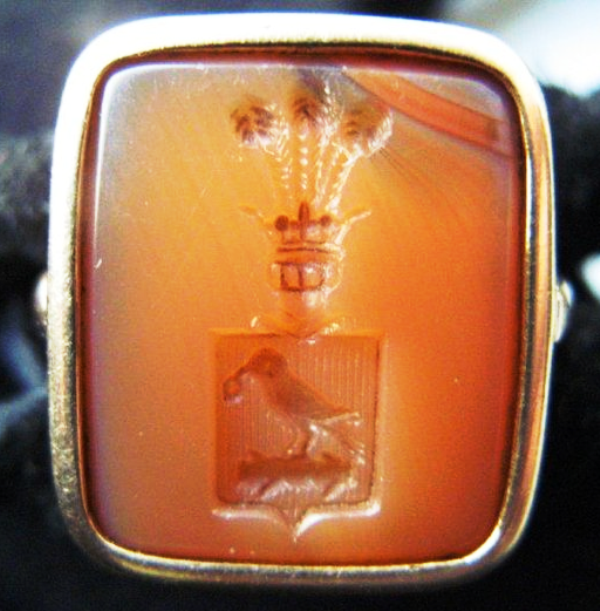
Polish signet ring in light-orange carnelian intaglio showing Korwin coat of arms

The red variety of chalcedony has been known to be used as beads since the Early Neolithic in Bulgaria. The first faceted (with constant 16+16=32 facets on each side of the bead) carnelian beads are described from the Varna Chalcolithic necropolis (middle of the 5th millennium BC). The bow drill was used to drill holes into carnelian in Mehrgarh in the 4th–5th millennium BC. Etched carnelian beads were manufactured by the Indus Valley Civilization during the 3rd millennium BCE. Carnelian was recovered from Bronze Age Minoan layers at Knossos on Crete in a form that demonstrated its use in decorative arts; this use dates to approximately 1800 BC. Carnelian was used widely during Roman times to make engraved gems for signet or seal rings for imprinting a seal with wax on correspondence or other important documents, as hot wax does not stick to carnelian. Sard was used for Assyrian cylinder seals, Egyptian and Phoenician scarabs, and early Greek and Etruscan gems. The Hebrew odem (also translated as sardius), was the first stone in the High Priest's breastplate, a red stone, probably sard but perhaps red jasper. In Revelation 4:3, the One seated on the heavenly throne seen in the vision of John the Apostle is said to "look like jasper and σαρδίῳ (sardius transliterated)." And likewise it is in Revelation 21:20 as one of the precious stones in the foundations of the wall of the heavenly city.

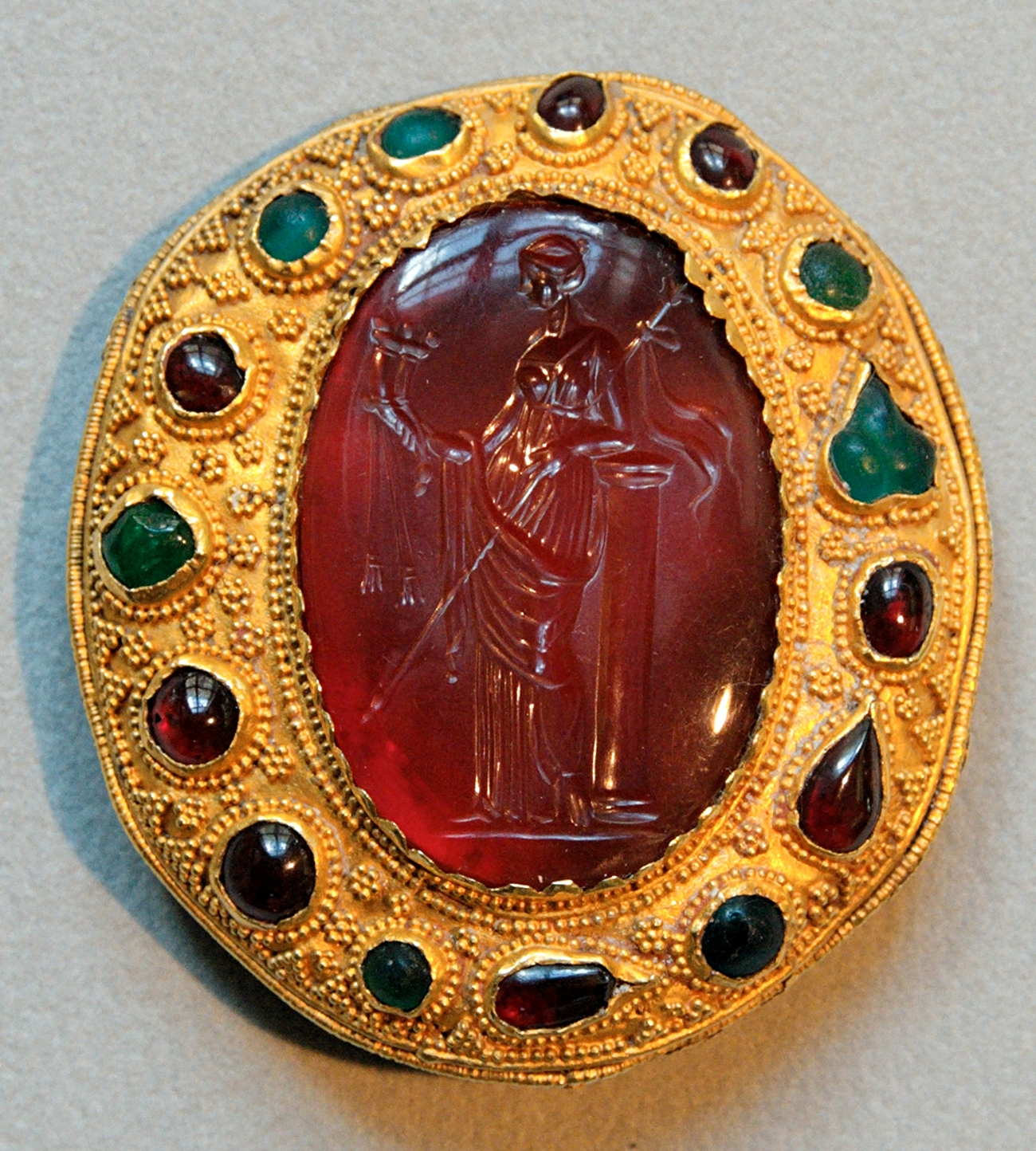
Carnelian intaglio with a Ptolemaic queen, Hellenistic artwork, Cabinet des Médailles, BnF Museum, Paris

There is a Neo-Assyrian seal made of carnelian in the Western Asiatic Seals collection of the British Museum that shows Ishtar-Gula as a star goddess. She is holding a ring of royal authority and is seated on a throne. She is shown with the spade of Marduk (his symbol), Sibbiti (seven) gods, the stylus of Nabu and a worshiper. An 8th century BC carnelian seal from the collection of the Ashmolean Museum in Oxford shows Ishtar-Gula with her dog facing the spade of Marduk and his red dragon.

== Etymology ==
Although now the more common term, "carnelian" is a 16th-century corruption of the 14th-century word "cornelian" (and its associated orthographies corneline and cornalyn). Cornelian, cognate with similar words in several Romance languages, comes from the Mediaeval Latin corneolus, itself derived from the Latin word cornum, the cornel cherry, whose translucent red fruits resemble the stone. The Oxford English Dictionary calls "carnelian" a perversion of "cornelian," by subsequent analogy with the Latin word caro, carnis ("flesh"). According to Pliny the Elder, sard derived its name from the city of Sardis in Lydia from which it came, and according to others, may ultimately be related to the Persian word سرد (sered, "yellowish-red"). Another possible derivation is from the Greek σάρξ (sarx, "flesh"); compare the surer etymology of onyx, which comes from Greek ὄνυξ (onyx, "claw, fingernail"), presumably because onyx with flesh-colored and white bands can resemble a fingernail.

== Distinction between carnelian and sard ==
The names carnelian and sard are often used interchangeably, but they can also be used to describe distinct subvarieties. The general differences are as follows:

Comparison of carnelian and sard
Aspect	Carnelian	Sard
Color	Lighter, with shades ranging from orange to reddish brown	Darker, with shades ranging from a deep reddish brown to almost black
Hardness	Softer	Harder and tougher
Fracture	Uneven, splintery and conchoidal	Like carnelian, but duller and more hackly (having the appearance of something that has been hacked, i.e. jagged)

All of these properties vary across a continuum, so the boundary between carnelian and sard is inherently blurry.

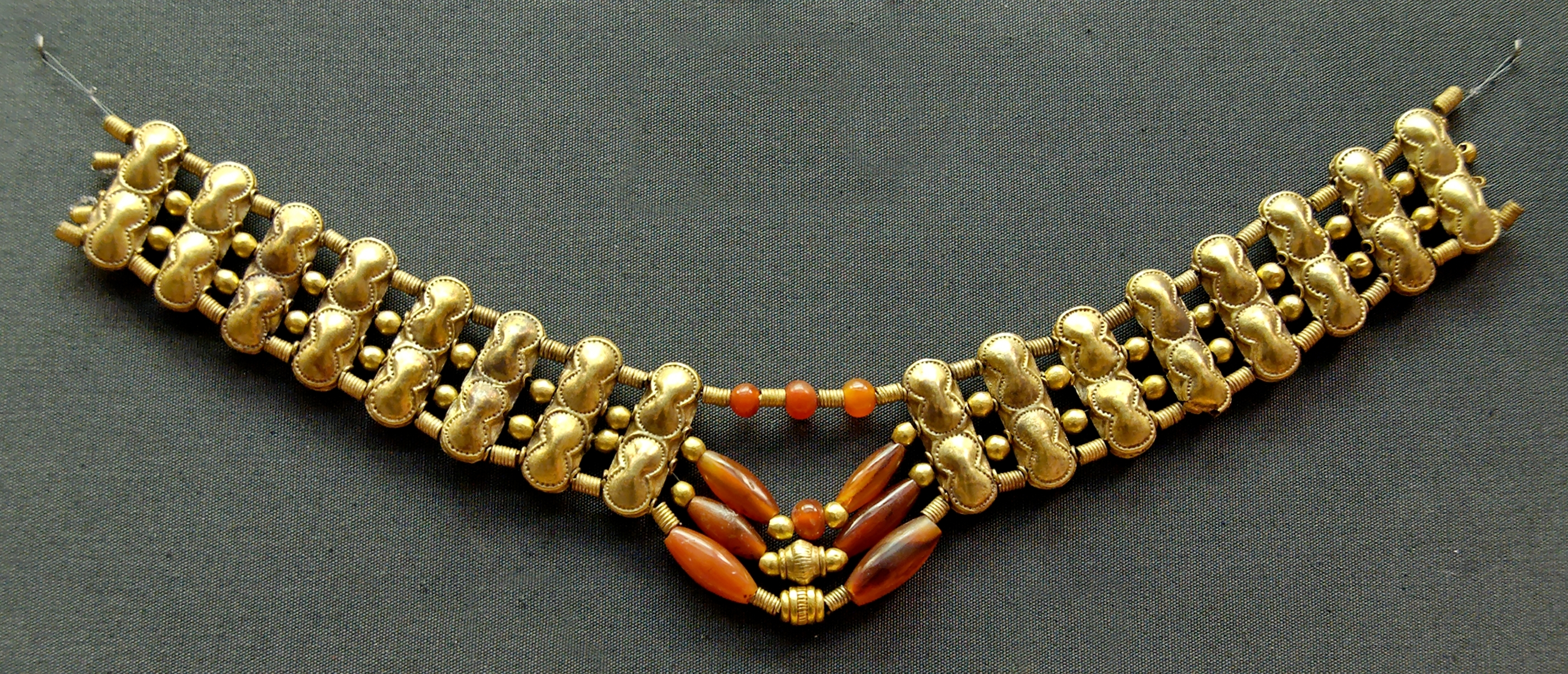
Necklace with gold beads and carnelian beads, Cypriot artwork with Mycenaean inspiration, c. 1400–1200 BC. From Enkomi. British Museum.

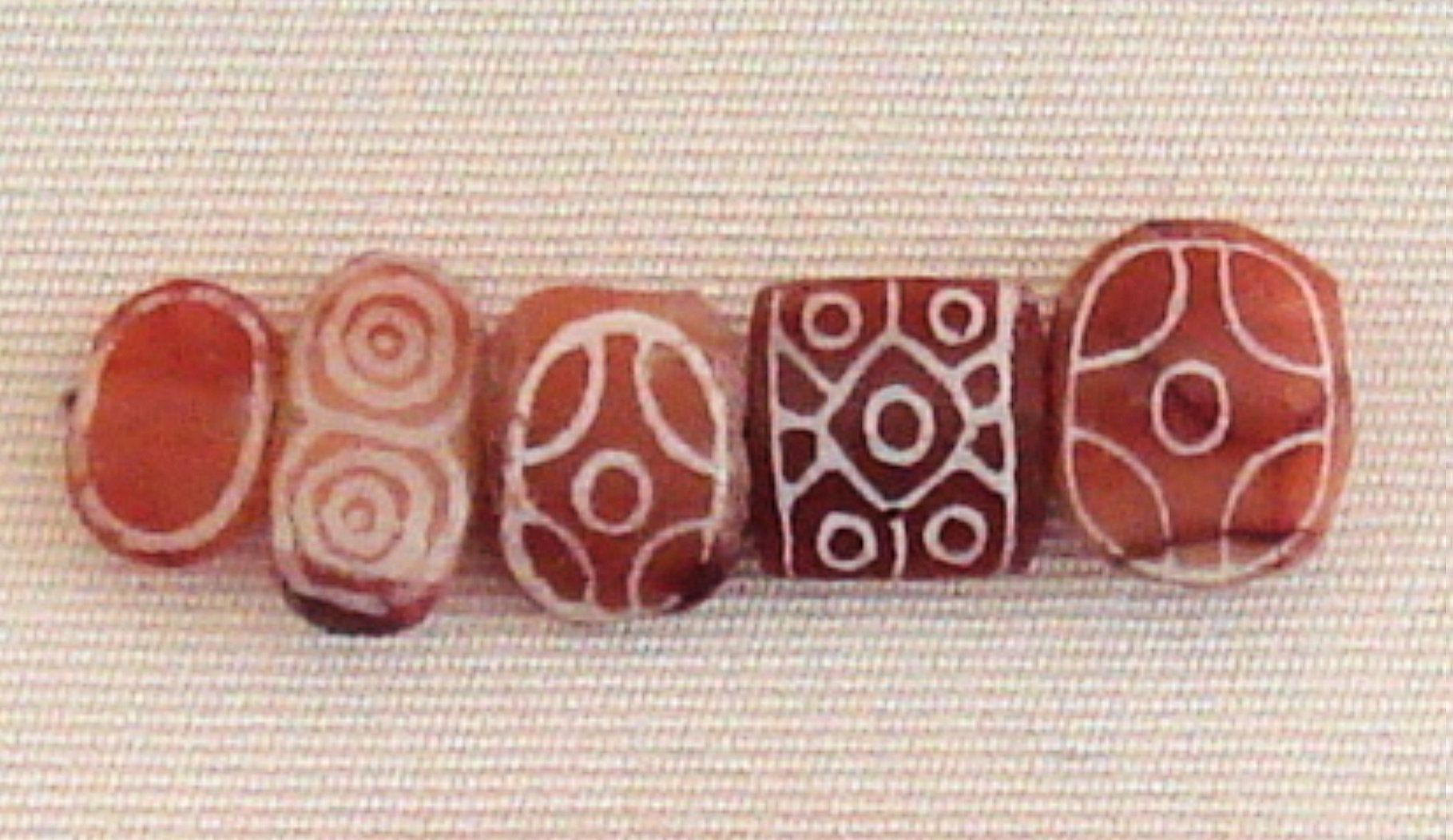
Indian carnelian beads, white design etched with acid, imported to Susa in 2600–1700 BC. Found in the tell of the Susa acropolis. Louvre Museum, reference Sb 17751. These beads are identical with beads found in the Indus Civilization site of Dholavira.

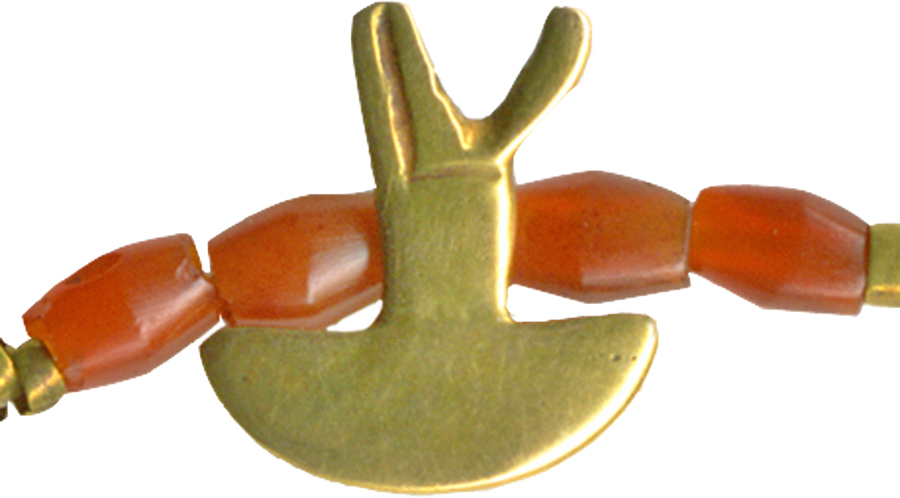
Egyptian necklace with biconical carnelian beads, rolled strips of sheet gold, and ten amulets. The Walters Art Museum, Baltimore.

== See also ==
- Carnelian (color)
- List of minerals
