= William Holmes (academic) =

English academic

- Born: 5 April 1689 parish of St Swithin, City of London
- Died: 4 April 1748 (aged 58)
- Resting place: Chapel of St John's College, Oxford
- Education: Merchant Taylors' School
- Alma mater: St John's College, Oxford
- Occupation: Historian
- Title: Regius Professor of Modern History
- Term: 1736–1742
- Predecessor: David Gregory
- Successor: Joseph Spence

William Holmes D.D. (5 April 1689 – 4 April 1748) was an English academic, Vice-Chancellor and Regius Professor of Modern History of the University of Oxford. He was also Dean of Exeter between 1742 and 1748.

== Life ==
Holmes was born on 5 April 1689 in the parish of St Swithin, in the City of London, the son of Thomas and Margaret Holmes of London, England. He began his education at Merchant Taylors' School, London, on 12 September 1701 and went up to St John's College, Oxford, on 11 June 1707, matriculating on 2 July. In 1710, he became a Fellow and graduated with a Bachelor of Arts degree on 16 May 1711, and was awarded the Master of Arts degree on 9 April 1715.

In 1721 Holmes was appointed as a proctor of the University. He took the Bachelor of Divinity degree on 13 April 1722 and the Doctorate of Divinity on 5 March 1725. Holmes held two college livings; between 1725 and 1726 that of North Leigh, near Oxford, and of Henbury, Gloucestershire from 1726 to 1728. He was elected President of St John's College on 3 June 1728. Holmes became the Rector of Boxwell, Gloucestershire, on 24 September and was given the college living of Hanborough, a few miles north of Long Hanborough, Oxfordshire, and between 1731 and 1737, he was proctor for the clergy of the diocese of Oxford in convocation.

Holmes was Vice-Chancellor of Oxford University between 1732 and 1735, and in this post, was appealed to by John Wesley about the concerns of the critics of the Holy Club. In 1734, he became a King's Chaplain. In his role as Vice-Chancellor, Holmes presented addresses from the university on the marriage of Anne, Princess Royal to William, Prince of Orange, the Prince having been under Holmes's care whilst in Oxford.

In 1736 Holmes was appointed as the Oxford Regius Professor of Modern History, a post he held until 1742. Whilst President of St John's, Holmes had the last letter of Sir Thomas White, the founder of college, printed to give every scholar on entering college, urging the fellows to peacefully with each other and suggests they "take a coppye of yt for my sake".

Holmes was ridiculed as "time-serving" in an imitation of the first satire of Juvenal, printed in London in 1740, and in a letter purporting to be written from Oxford, published in British Champions, or, The Impartial Advertiser on 10 January 1743, which printed "that ornament of learning and politeness H—es" is an example of those that "steer judiciously between all extremes". Holmes was the first president of St John's to be loyal to the House of Hanover.

Holmes was supportive of sound learning and met with Thomas Hearne, who wished the University to plan the printing of Oxford manuscripts. On 9 July 1733, acting as Vice-Chancellor he revived the ceremony of "the act", which had been discontinued, and invited George Frideric Handel to play before and after the ceremony. However, his allowing Handel to perform inside the Sheldonian Theatre on several occasions outside of University ceremonies and to charge 5 shillings. for admission, offended Hearne and other traditionalists. Hearne stated that "Handel and (his lousy crew) a great number of foreign fiddlers". At another time, Holmes refused a company of players from visiting Oxford.

He was from 1728 to 1748 the President of St John's College, Oxford. He was nominated by George II to the deanery of Exeter Cathedral on 4 June 1742. Holmes was buried in the college chapel, and on the instruction of his wife, Sarah, a monument to him was erected in the college chapel. On his death on 4 April 1748, Holmes left an estate of two farms and £200 a year to St John's College.

== Works ==
Only one work is ascribed to Holmes, The Country Parson's Advice to his Parishioners … of the Younger Sort, which was an anonymous publication of 1742.

Academic offices
Preceded by William Delaune	President of St John's College, Oxford; 1728–1748	Succeeded by William Derham
Preceded by Edward Butler	Vice-Chancellor of Oxford University; 1732–1735	Succeeded by Stephen Niblett
Church of England titles
Preceded by Alured Clarke	Dean of Exeter; 1742–1748	Succeeded by Charles Lyttelton
