= Fire agate =

Variety of chalcedony with fire-like flashes

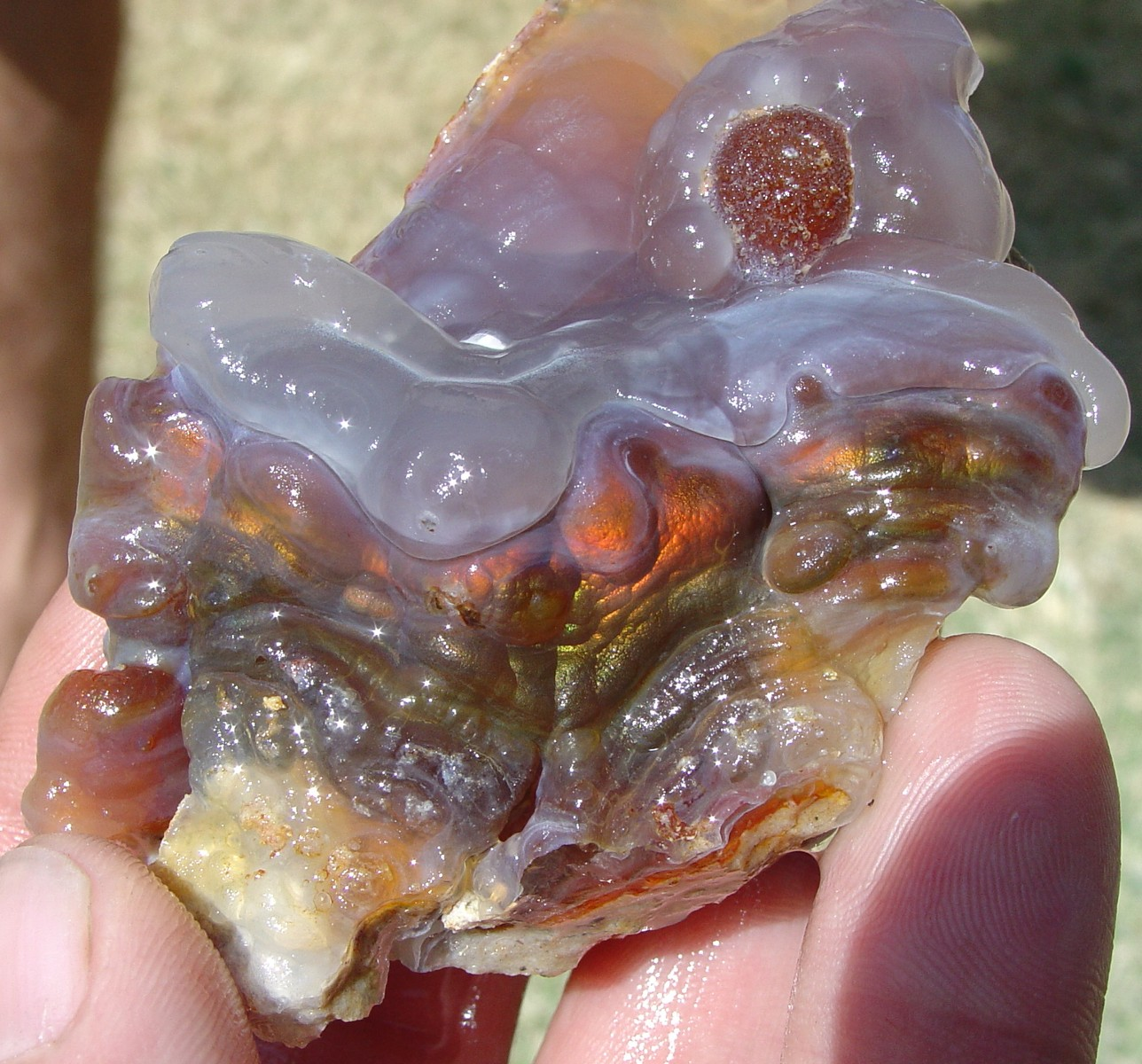
- Raw fire agate

General
- Category: Tectosilicate minerals
- Group: Quartz group
- Formula: Silica (silicon dioxide, SiO_{2})
- IMA status: Variety of quartz (chalcedony)
- Crystal system: Trigonal (quartz), monoclinic (moganite)

Identification
- Formula mass: 60 g / mol
- Color: Red to orange, brown, iridescent flashes
- Crystal habit: Frequently botryoidal, microgranular aggregates
- Cleavage: Absent
- Fracture: Uneven, splintery, conchoidal
- Mohs scale hardness: 6.5-7
- Luster: Waxy, vitreous
- Streak: White
- Diaphaneity: Translucent to opaque
- Specific gravity: 2.60- 2.64
- Optical properties: Uniaxial (+)
- Refractive index: 1.530 to 1.543
- Birefringence: 0.003 to 0.009
- Pleochroism: None
- Common impurities: Iron oxides (limonite or goethite)

Fire agate is a variety of chalcedony that displays fire-like iridescent flashes. It is found only in certain areas of central and northern Mexico and the southwestern United States (New Mexico, Arizona and California). Despite its name, it is not a true agate, since it typically does not have bands. Approximately 24-36 million years ago, during the Tertiary Period, these areas were subjected to massive volcanic activity. Fire agates were formed when hot water, saturated with silica and iron oxide, filled cracks and cavities in the surrounding rock and solidified into chalcedony layered with crystallized iron oxide.

Fire agates have beautiful iridescent rainbow colors, similar to opal. They have a hardness of 6.5-7 on the Mohs scale, which reduces the occurrence of scratching when polished gemstones are set in jewelry. The vibrant iridescent rainbow colors found within fire agates are created by the Schiller effect, which is also found in mother-of-pearl. The brown color and iridescence of fire agates is due to inclusions of the iron oxides goethite or limonite.
