= Edward Holdsworth =

English classical scholar (1684–1746)

Edward Holdsworth (1684–1746) was an English classical scholar, known as a Neo-Latin poet.

== Early life ==
The son of Thomas Holdsworth, rector of North Stoneham, Hampshire, he was born there on 6 August 1684, and baptised on 3 September. He was educated at Winchester College, and in 1694 was elected a scholar at the age of nine. On 14 December 1704 he matriculated at Corpus Christi College, Oxford, but in July of the following year migrated to Magdalen College on his election as a demy, graduating B.A. on 22 June 1708, and M.A. on 18 April 1711. For some years he remained at Oxford as tutor of his college, but in 1715, when his turn came to be chosen fellow, he resigned his post and left the university, because he wasn't prepared to take the oath of allegiance after the Hanoverian succession.

== Private tutor and scholar ==
For the rest of his life Holdsworth was tutor in households of those who shared his political opinions, or travelled abroad with their children. Alexander Pope wrote to him (December 1737), asking him to support Walter Harte's candidature for the poetry professorship at Oxford. Joseph Spence met Holdsworth in Florence in 1732, and in his Polymetis praised him for his understanding of Virgil.

Holdsworth visited Rome in 1741, in the company of George Pitt, and in September 1742 he paid, in company with Thomas Townson and others, long visits to France and Italy, returning home with Townson by way of Mont Cenis in the autumn of 1745. They were met on their last visit to Rome by James Russel, son of Richard Russel, the reputed author of Letters from a Young Painter Abroad.

== Death ==
Holdsworth died of fever at Lord Digby's house, near Coleshill, Warwickshire, on 30 December 1746, and was buried in the church on 4 January.

== Works ==
Holdsworth's most famous production was the Muscipula sive Cambro-muo-machia (anonymous, London 1709), a mock-heroic satire on the Welsh people. It appeared first without his consent, and without a printer's name. It was then republished in a corrected form by its author, with a dedication to Robert Lloyd, a fellow-commoner of Magdalen College; and also was immediately reproduced by Edmund Curll, all three editions being dated 1709. Thomas Richards of Jesus College, Oxford retaliated against this ridicule of his Welsh fellow-countrymen, and issued the same year Χοιροχωρογραφία, sive Hoglandiæ descriptio, a satire on Hampshire, Holdsworth's native county. Muscipula was then often reprinted and translated.

The other writings of Holdsworth dealt with Virgil. There appeared in his lifetime a volume entitled Pharsalia and Philippi. After his death came out Dissertations upon eight verses in the Second Book of Virgil's Georgics [i.e. lines 65–72]. To which is added a New Edition of the Muscipula, together with a New Translation, 1749.

== Memorial and legacy ==
Charles Jennens of Gopsall in Leicestershire, to whom Holdsworth left his notes on Virgil, placed a plain black marble stone above his grave. In 1764 a monument to his memory, with a long Latin inscription, and with a figure of Religion by Louis-François Roubiliac, was erected in an Ionic temple built by Jennens in the wood at Gopsall known by the name of the Racecourse. The temple fell down in 1835, when the cenotaph was removed into the gardens on the east side of the mansion. The monument still exists, but has been moved to the gardens of Belgrave Hall Museum.

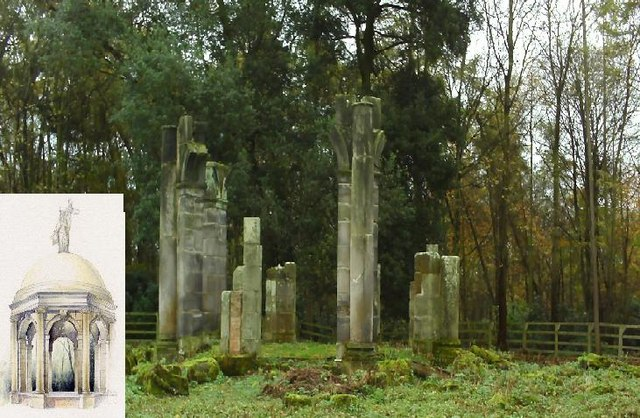
Gopsall Hall Temple today, with an architect's drawing of the original

Holdsworth's plan of rebuilding Magdalen College in the Palladian style was approved of, and began in 1733, but only one block, called the New Buildings, was executed. He left money to the building fund.

== Bibliography ==
Amanda Babington and Ilias Chrissochoidis, "Musical References in the Jennens–Holdsworth Correspondence (1729–46)," Royal Musical Association Research Chronicle 45:1 (2014), 76–129.
