= Thomas Nowell =

Welsh-born clergyman, historian and religious controversialist

- Born: 1730?
- Died: 23 September 1801; St Mary Hall, Oxford
- Education: Oriel College, Oxford
- Occupations: Historian and theologian
- Title: Regius Professor of Modern History
- Term: 1771-1801
- Predecessor: John Vivian
- Successor: Henry Beeke

Thomas Nowell (1730? – 23 September 1801) was a Welsh-born clergyman, historian and religious controversialist.

== Life ==
Nowell was the son of Cradock Nowell of Cardiff. He went up to Oriel College, Oxford, in 1746 and in 1747 he won the Duke of Beaufort's exhibition. He graduated with a Bachelor of Arts degree in 1750, was awarded an exhibitionship in 1752, and took his Master of Arts degree in 1753. Nowell was made a fellow of Oriel in 1753 and served as junior treasurer to college between 1755 and 1757, senior treasurer between 1757 and 1758, and Dean between 1758 and 1760 and again in 1763.

In 1759 Benjamin Buckler preached a flippant sermon at All Souls College, Oxford, titled Elisha's Visit to Gilgal, and his Healing the Pot of Pottage, Symbolically Explain'd. In 1760 Nowell wrote an anonymous rebuttal titled A Dissertation upon that Species of Writing called Humour, when Applied to Sacred Subjects, which argued that biblical topics deserved to be treated with 'decency and seriousness' instead of humour and levity.

Between 1760 and 1776, Nowell was Public Orator of Oxford University. Oriel nominated Nowell for the post of Junior Proctor to the university in 1761, and Nowell spent many years as Secretary to the Chancellor of the university. In 1764 Nowell became Principal of St Mary Hall and obtained both a Bachelor of Divinity and a Doctorate of Divinity in the same month of his appointment as principal. In 1764 Nowell married Sarah Munday (the daughter of Sir Thomas Munday, Oxford upholsterer) and had one son, Thomas, who died in childhood in 1768. On getting married, Nowell resigned his fellowship at Oriel. In 1771 Lord North appointed him to the Regius Professorship of Modern History at Oxford, a post he held, along with the principalship of St Mary Hall, until his death in 1801.
