= John Vivian (historian) =

British historian and professor

- Occupation: Historian
- Title: Regius Professor of Modern History
- Term: 1768-1771
- Predecessor: Joseph Spence
- Successor: Thomas Nowell

John Vivian (c.1729–1771) was the Regius Professor of Modern History at Oxford between 1768 and 1771. He was the son of William Vivian of Padstow, Cornwall, and became a Fellow of Balliol College, Oxford in 1750.
