= Regius Professor of History (Oxford) =

Senior professorship in history at University of Oxford

The Regius Professor of History (until 2011, Modern History) at the University of Oxford is a long-established professorial position. Holders of the title have often been medieval historians. The first appointment was made in 1724. The term "Regius" reflects the origins of the post as a royal appointment, itself a recognition of the important influence of history.

The Regius Professor of History is ex officio a Fellow of Oriel College. Professor Lyndal Roper held the Regius Professorship from 2011 to 2025, the first woman (and the first Australian) to have done so.

== Past holders (complete) ==
- 1724–1736 – David Gregory
- 1736–1742 – William Holmes
- 1742–1768 – Joseph Spence
- 1768–1771 – John Vivian
- 1771–1801 – Thomas Nowell
- 1801–1813 – Henry Beeke
- 1813–1841 – Edward Nares
- 1841–1842 – Thomas Arnold
- 1842–1848 – John Antony Cramer
- 1848–1858 – Henry Halford Vaughan
- 1858–1866 – Goldwin Smith
- 1866–1884 – William Stubbs
- 1884–1892 – Edward Augustus Freeman
- 1892–1894 – James Anthony Froude
- 1894–1904 – Frederick York Powell
- 1904–1925 – Charles Harding Firth
- 1925–1928 – Henry William Carless Davis
- 1928–1947 – Maurice Powicke
- 1947–1957 – Vivian Hunter Galbraith
- 1957–1980 – Hugh Trevor-Roper
- 1980–1989 – Michael Eliot Howard
- 1990–1997 – John Huxtable Elliott
- 1997–2011 – Robert John Weston Evans
- 2011–2025 – Lyndal Roper

== See also ==
- Regius Professor of History (Cambridge)
