= Alured Clarke (priest) =

British priest (1696-1742)

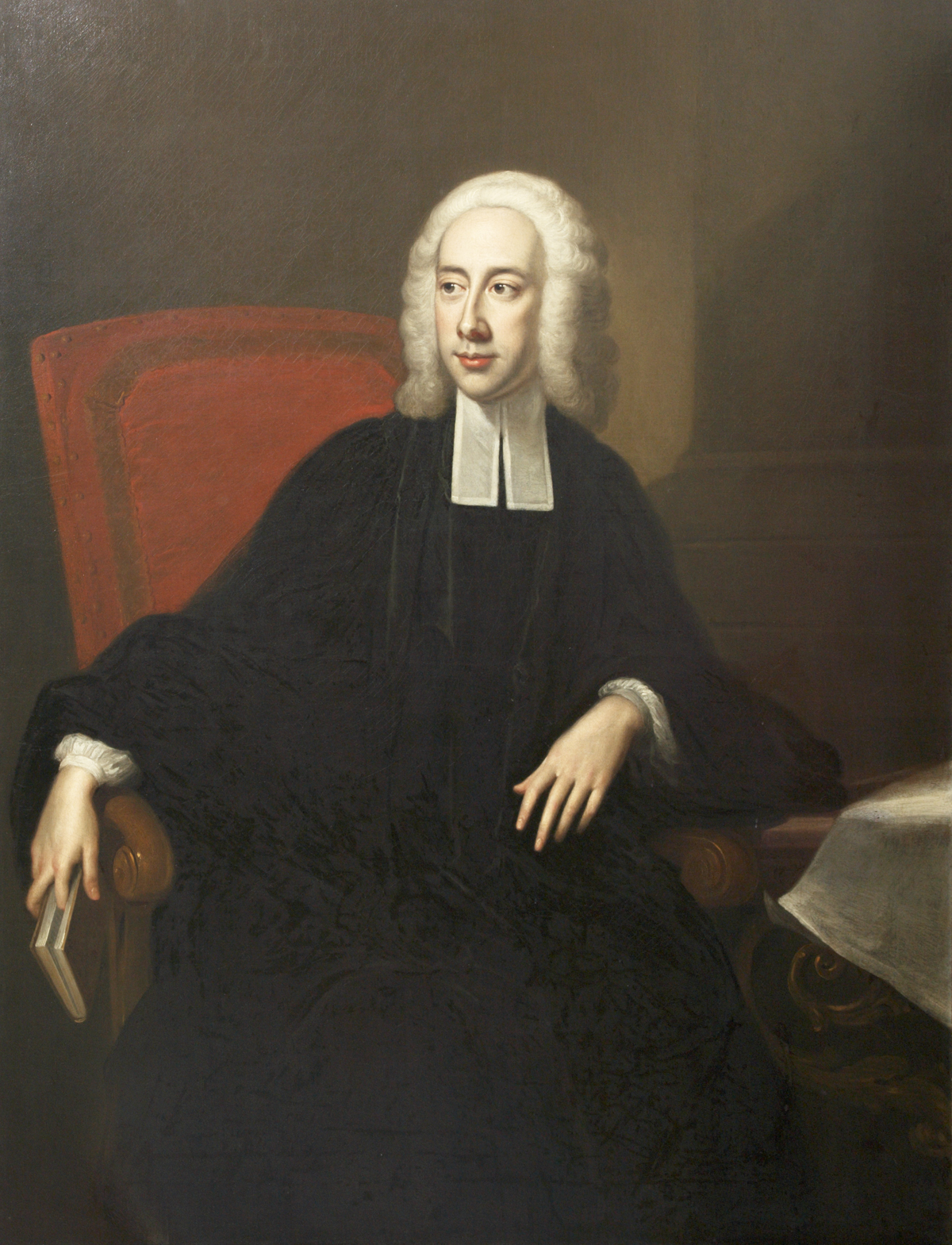
- Alured Clarke, 1741 portrait by James Wills
- Born: 1669
- Died: 31 May 1742
- Education: St Paul's School, London; Corpus Christi College, Cambridge
- Occupation: chaplain
- Known for: Dean of Exeter

Alured Clarke (1696–1742) was Dean of Exeter between 1741 and 1742.

== Life ==
He was the son of Alured Clarke, of Godmanchester in Huntingdonshire, who died on 28 October 1744, aged 86, by his second wife, Ann, fourth daughter of the Rev. Charles Trimnell, rector of Ripton-Abbotts, in the same county, who died on 26 May 1755, aged 88. Bishop Charles Trimnell was his uncle, and his only brother was Charles Clarke (died 1750), baron of the exchequer.

Clarke's education began at St Paul's School, London and from 1712 to 1719 he held one of its exhibitions. On 1 April 1713 he was admitted a pensioner at Corpus Christi College, Cambridge, taking the degrees of B.A. 1716, M.A. 1720, D.D. 1728, and being elected to a fellowship in 1718. About 1720 he contested the post of Professor of Rhetoric at Gresham College, unsuccessfully. He rose rapidly in the church, by the influence of Whig relatives: he was chaplain in ordinary to George I and George II. The living of Chilbolton in Hampshire and a prebendal stall in Winchester Cathedral were bestowed on him in May 1723. He was installed as prebendary of Westminster in July 1731, and as dean of Exeter in January 1741, with a prebend in the Exeter Cathedral. His cathedral dignities, and the position of deputy clerk of the closet, were retained by him until his death.

Clarke was afflicted with illness for many years before his death. In 1732, he thought of applying for the position of British consul at Algiers, for the benefit of the climate. But he stayed in England, and gradually wasted away. He died on 31 May 1742. He was buried, without a monument, in Westminster Abbey.

In politics Clarke was a Whig; his religious opinions were those of Queen Caroline of Ansbach and her spiritual adviser Samuel Clarke. Letters in Katherine Thomson's Memoirs of Viscountess Sundon show he was avid for preferment.

== Legacy ==
Winchester County Hospital, the first in England outside London, was established in Hampshire in 1736, largely by Clarke's efforts, and its constitution and rules were written by him. He laid the foundation-stone of the Devon and Exeter Hospital in Exeter, of which he has been called the co-founder, on 27 August 1741. He also expended large sums in repair of the decanal house at Exeter.

== Works ==
Clarke's main literary work was An Essay towards the Character of her late Majesty, Caroline (1738, and in German at Altona in the same year), considered rose-tinted. His other works were sermons:

- Sermon preached at St. Paul's, 25 January 1726, on the anniversary meeting of gentlemen educated at St. Paul's School (1726).
- Sermon preached before the House of Commons, at St. Margaret's, Westminster, on 31 January 1731 (1731, 2nd edit. 1731).
- Sermon preached in Winchester Cathedral, before the governors of the County Hospital, at its opening, on St. Luke's Day, 18 Oct. 1736 (1737, 2nd edit. 1737, 3rd edit. Norwich, 1769). With this sermon went A Collection of Papers relating to the County Hospital at Winchester (1737), introduction by Clarke.
- Sermon preached before the Trustees of the Charity Schools at Exeter Cathedral, 13 October 1741 (1741).

== Notes ==
Attribution

This article incorporates text from a publication now in the public domain: "Clarke, Alured (1696-1742)". Dictionary of National Biography. London: Smith, Elder & Co. 1885–1900.

Church of England titles
Preceded by John Gilbert	Dean of Exeter; 1742–1743	Succeeded by William Holmes
