= David Gregory (historian) =

English churchman and academic

David Gregory (1696–16 September 1767) was an English churchman and academic, Dean of Christ Church, Oxford and the first Regius Professor of Modern History at Oxford.

== Life ==
He was the son of David Gregory (1661–1708), the mathematician. Two years after his father's death Gregory was admitted a queen's scholar of Westminster School, from which in 1714 he was elected to Christ Church, Oxford. He graduated B.A. 8 May 1718, and M.A. 27 June 1721, and on 18 April 1724 became the first Professor of Modern History and Languages at Oxford.

He soon afterwards took orders and was appointed rector of Semley, Wiltshire; proceeding B.D. 13 March 1731 and D.D. in the following year (7 July 1732). He continued to hold his professorship till 1736, when he resigned it on his appointment to a canonry in Christ Church Cathedral (installed 8 June). While canon (1750) he repaired and adorned Christ Church Hall, and presented to it busts of kings George I and George II.

He was promoted to the deanery (installed 18 May 1756). Under his directions while dean the upper rooms in the college library were finished (1761), and he is said to have restored the terraces in the great quadrangle (Tom Quad).

On 15 September 1759 he was also appointed Master of Sherburn Hospital, County Durham, where he started to cut down a wood on the hospital estates, and with the proceeds from the timber improved the accommodation, as mentioned by an anonymous eulogy Essay on the Life of David Gregory, late Dean of Christ Church, London (1769). In 1761 he was prolocutor of the lower Convocation House. He died at the age of seventy-one, 16 September 1767, and was buried under a plain slab with a short Latin inscription in the cathedral, his wedding ring tied to his finger. Gregory was a considerable benefactor both to his college and Sherburne Hospital.

== Works ==
Gregory wrote Latin verses, and testified his loyalty by Latin poems on the death of George I and the accession of George II, lamenting also in verse the death of the latter, and congratulating George III when he succeeded his grandfather.

== Family ==
He was son-in-law to Henry Grey, 1st Duke of Kent, having married Lady Mary Grey, who died before him (in 1762, aged 42), and lies in the same grave.
