= Christopher Pitt =

English poet

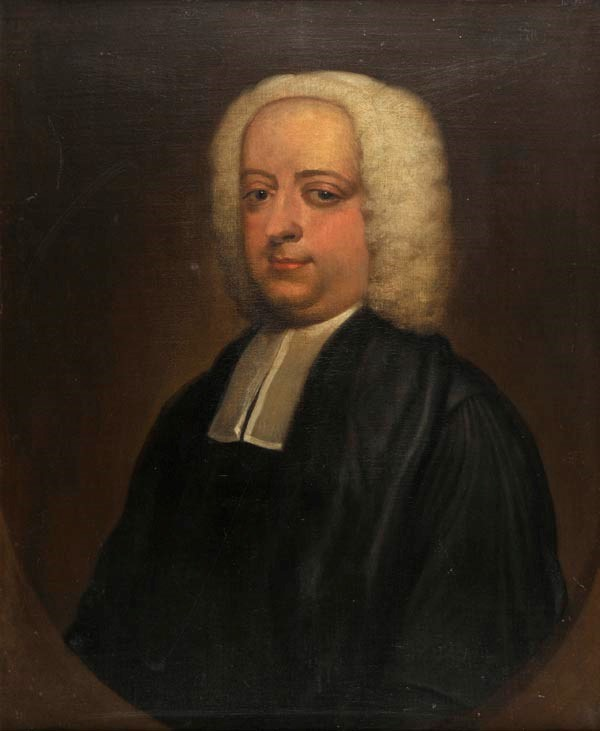
A portrait of Christopher Pitt, painted by George Dowdney

Christopher Pitt (1699 – 13 April 1748) was an English clergyman poet; he was also a translator whose performance was esteemed in his day.

== Family connections ==
Christopher Pitt came from a family wide-spread in the West of England. Several of them had a political career, of whom the best known was William Pitt the Elder, a descendant of Christopher’s second cousin, Thomas Pitt. Pitt himself was the second son of Dr Christopher Pitt, a respected physician at Blandford Forum. Having a Classical education himself, the father contributed a translation of the episode on the plague of Athens to Thomas Creech’s edition of Lucretius, while Robert Pitt, Christopher’s elder brother, followed his father’s medical profession, wrote on medical matters and also translated the first five books of Paradise Lost into Latin verse. There is a strong sense of family connections in Christopher Pitt’s poetical career. His first published work as an undergraduate, "A Poem on the death of the late Earl Stanhope" (1721), was dedicated to the earl’s widow, who was Christopher’s second cousin, Lucy. His collection of Poems & Translations (1727) was dedicated to his uncle, George Pitt of Stratfield Saye. And among his later poems were Horatian epistles addressed to John Pitt, another second cousin and one of Lucy’s brothers.

== Life ==
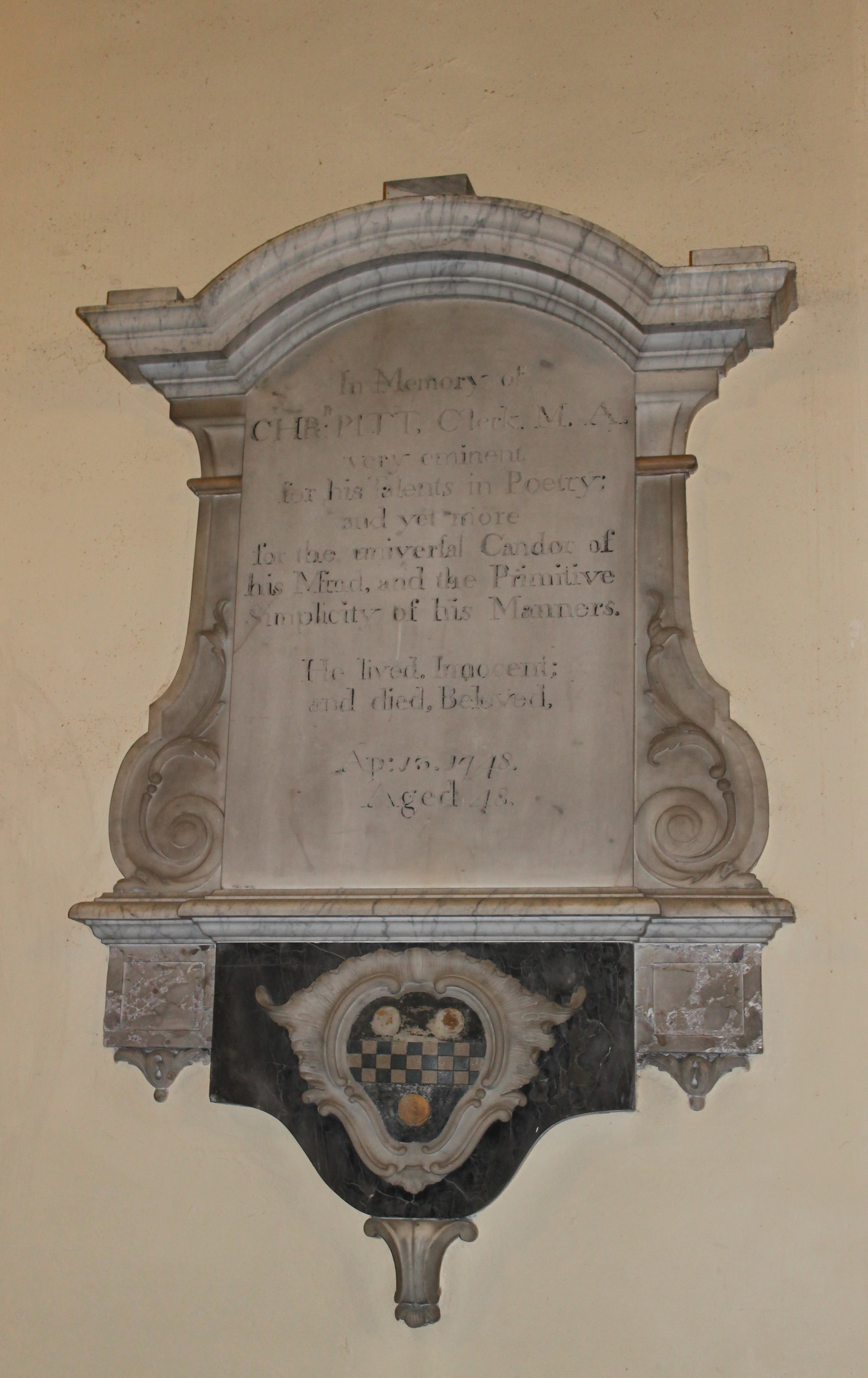
Mural monument to Christopher Pitt in the church of St Peter and St Paul, Blandford Forum, Dorset

Pitt was educated at Winchester College and went on to study at New College, Oxford in 1719. He is credited with arriving there with two manuscript volumes of his verse, one of which was a translation of Lucan’s Pharsalia. However, on discovering that Nicholas Rowe had already made a good translation of Lucan’s work, he never submitted his for publication. However, in 1721 he published two shorter works, the "Poem on the death of the late Earl Stanhope" and – anonymously as "a person of quality" – "The Plague of Marseilles". His translation of Marco Girolamo Vida’s Art of Poetry in 1725 brought him some reputation and also the friendship of Alexander Pope, whose own An Essay on Criticism (a work that Pitt judiciously echoed in homage) covered much the same ground. From then on his time was divided between religious duties, which left him ample leisure for continuing his literary work, to visiting friends, and to recurring periods of gout. A facetious poem by his "brother" poet describes one such episode while paying tribute to his version of the Aeneid. This ambitious translation project, completed in 1740, guaranteed frequent publication of all his poetry for the rest of the century, as well as a biographical preface in Samuel Johnson’s Lives of the Poets.

Christopher Pitt had been presented with the rectory of Pimperne by his uncle George and, having taken holy orders, lived there permanently from 1724. After his death in 1748 tributes noted that he died without a single enemy, and also echoed the wording on the memorial tablet in the church at Blandford referring to "the universal candour of his mind and the primitive simplicity of his manner".
