= Chalcedony =

Microcrystalline or cryptocrystalline form of silica

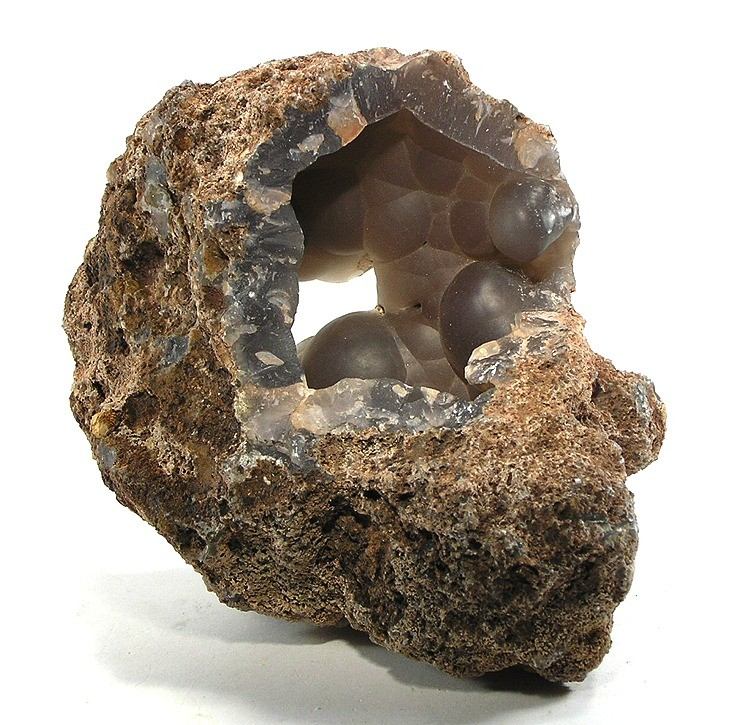
- A botryoidal geode specimen from Chihuahua

General
- Category: Tectosilicate minerals
- Group: Quartz group
- Formula: SiO_{2} (silica)
- IMA status: Variety of quartz
- Crystal system: Trigonal (quartz) or monoclinic (moganite)

Identification
- Formula mass: 60 g/mol
- Color: Various
- Crystal habit: Various
- Cleavage: Absent
- Fracture: Uneven, splintery, conchoidal
- Mohs scale hardness: 6–7
- Luster: Waxy, vitreous, dull, greasy, silky
- Streak: White
- Diaphaneity: Translucent
- Specific gravity: 2.59–2.61

Chalcedony (Note: Pronounced /kælˈsɛdəni/ kal-SED-ə-nee or /ˈkælsədoʊni/ KAL-sə-doh-nee) is an aggregate of cryptocrystalline or microcrystalline silica, or in simpler terms, a mass of individual silica crystals that are too small to be seen without magnification. It is composed primarily of quartz, with minor amounts of intergrown moganite. These are both silica minerals with a chemical composition of SiO_{2}, but they differ in that quartz has a more symmetrical crystal structure (trigonal) than moganite (monoclinic). Mineralogically speaking, the quartz and moganite crystals in chalcedony must grow in parallel chains, called "fibers." However, the term chalcedony may more broadly refer to any microcrystalline or cryptocrystalline silica, fibrous or not.

Chalcedony has a waxy luster, and may be semitransparent or translucent. It can assume a wide range of colors, but those most commonly seen are white to gray, grayish-blue or a shade of brown ranging from pale to nearly black. The color of chalcedony sold commercially is often enhanced by dyeing or heating.

== Etymology ==
The name chalcedony comes from the Latin chalcedonius (alternatively spelled calchedonius) and is probably derived from the town of Chalcedon in Asia Minor. According to the Online Etymology Dictionary, however, a connection with the town of Chalcedon is "very doubtful". The name appears in Pliny the Elder's Naturalis Historia as a term for a translucent kind of jaspis.

Another reference to a gem by the name of khalkedón (χαλκηδών) is found in the Book of Revelation (21:19); however, it is a hapax legomenon, found nowhere else in the Bible, so it is hard to tell whether the precious gem mentioned in Revelation is the same as the mineral known by this name today. The term plasma is sometimes used to refer to green translucent chalcedony.

== Composition ==
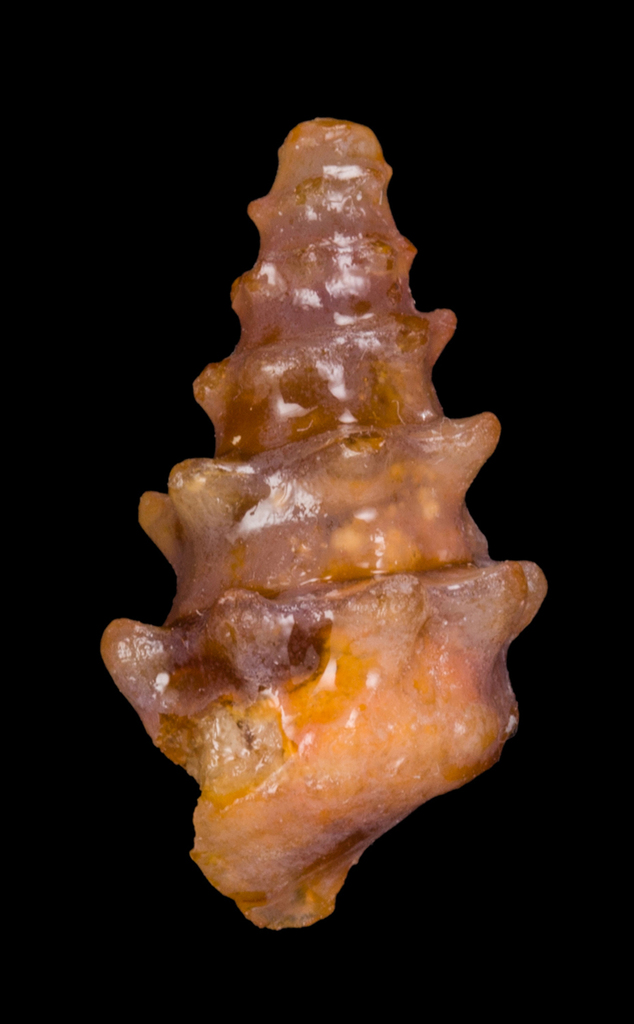
A rare pseudomorph of a spiral Turritella-like snail shell that has been replaced by chalcedony

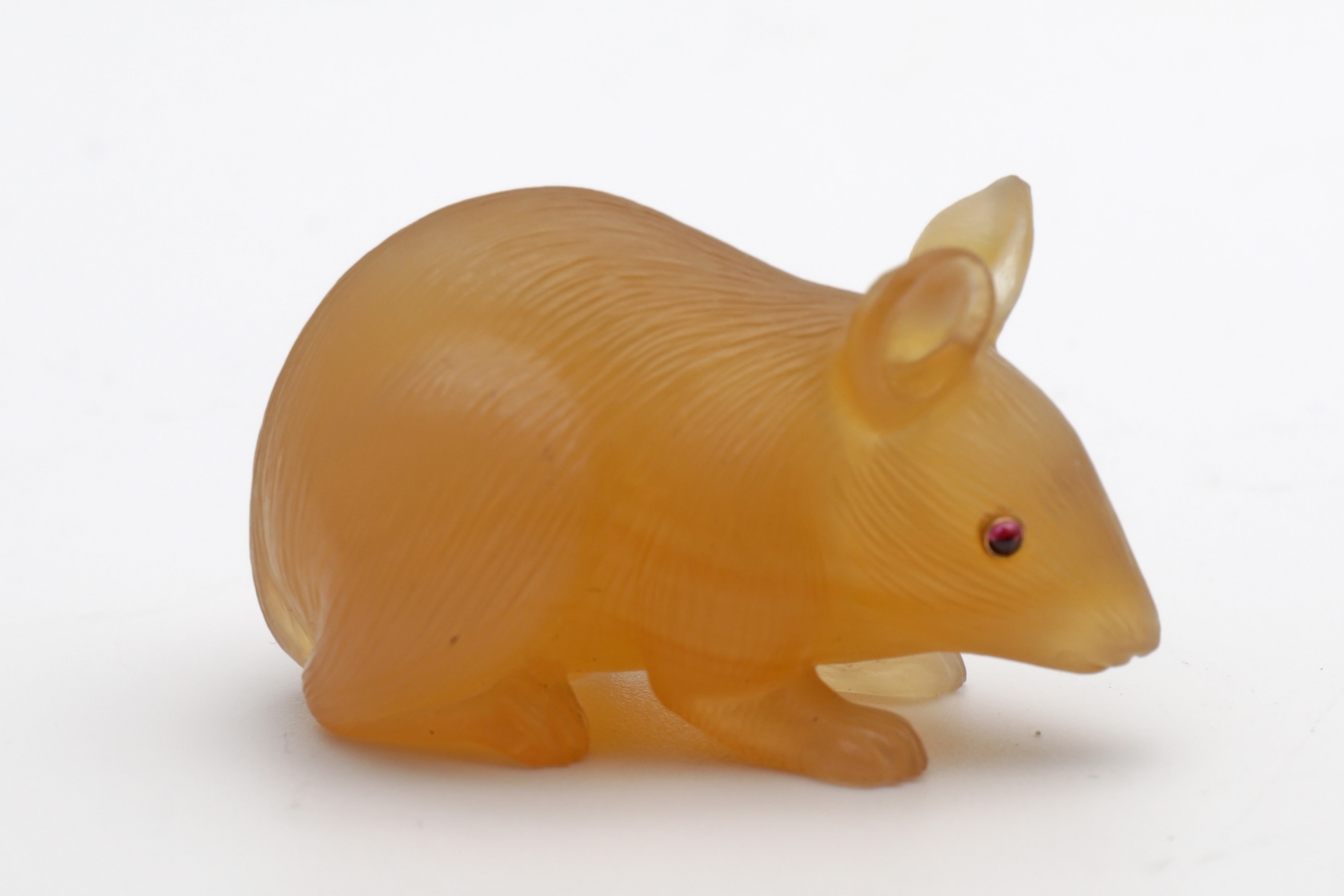
Chalcedony mouse, by Avenir Sumin

Chalcedony is an aggregate of microscopic (microcrystalline) or submicroscopic (cryptocrystalline) silica crystals. The mineral species of silica present in chalcedony is typically quartz, although a percentage may be moganite, a quartz polymorph. The existence of moganite was once regarded as dubious, but it is now officially recognized by the International Mineralogical Association.

All forms of silica, including quartz and moganite, have a chemical composition of SiO_{2}. They differ in that quartz has greater symmetry, crystallizing in the trigonal crystal system while moganite crystallizes in the monoclinic crystal system. Over geological time, the metastable moganite is recrystallized as quartz.

Unlike macroscopic (macrocrystalline) quartz, which is anhydrous, chalcedony normally contains very small amounts of water.

== Structure ==
In mineralogical literature, chalcedony refers strictly to fibrous microcrystalline or cryptocrystalline quartz. Chalcedony fibers are twisted along their length, giving them a helical shape. Individual fibers in agates were determined by X-ray diffraction to be 0.1-1.0 µm in diameter and up to several millimeters long.

There are two distinct types of chalcedony fibers. Length-fast chalcedony fibers consist of crystals stacked perpendicular to the c-axis (side to side). These crystals are intergrown, polysynthetic twins according to Brazil law. Length-slow chalcedony, also known as quartzine, consists of quartz crystals stacked parallel to the c-axis (tip to tip).

== Properties ==
=== Solubility ===
Chalcedony is more soluble than quartz under low-temperature conditions, despite the two minerals being chemically identical. Possible reasons include the existence of the moganite component, defects caused by Brazil twinning, and small crystal size.

== Varieties ==
Chalcedony occurs in a wide range of varieties. Many semi-precious gemstones are in fact forms of chalcedony. The more notable varieties of chalcedony are as follows:

=== Agate ===
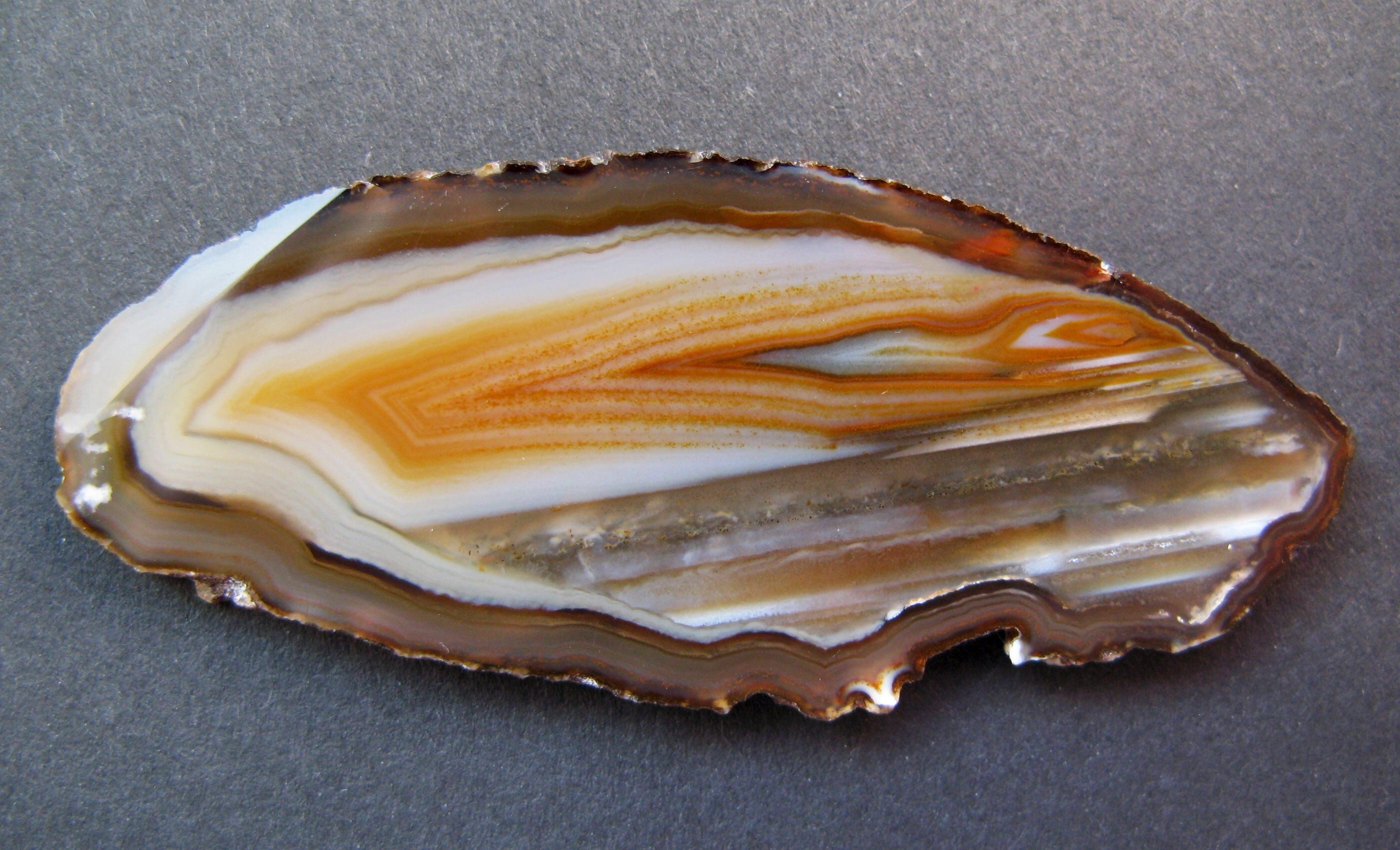
Agate

Agate is a fibrous, banded variety of chalcedony that occurs in a variety of colors and patterns. Iris agate shows exceptional iridescence when light (especially pinpointed light) is shone through the stone.

=== Carnelian ===
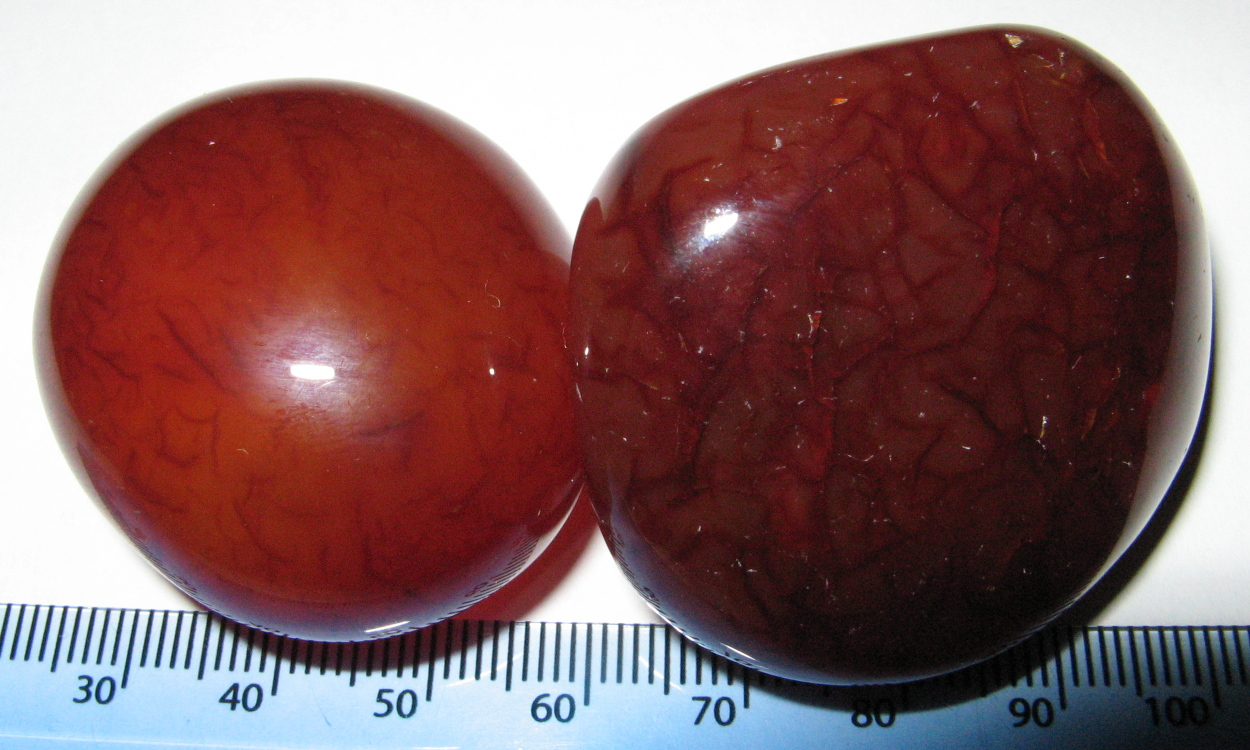
Carnelian

Carnelian (also spelled cornelian) is a clear-to-translucent reddish-brown variety of chalcedony. Its hue may vary from a pale orange to an intense almost-black coloration. Similar to carnelian is sard, which is brown rather than red.

=== Chrysoprase ===
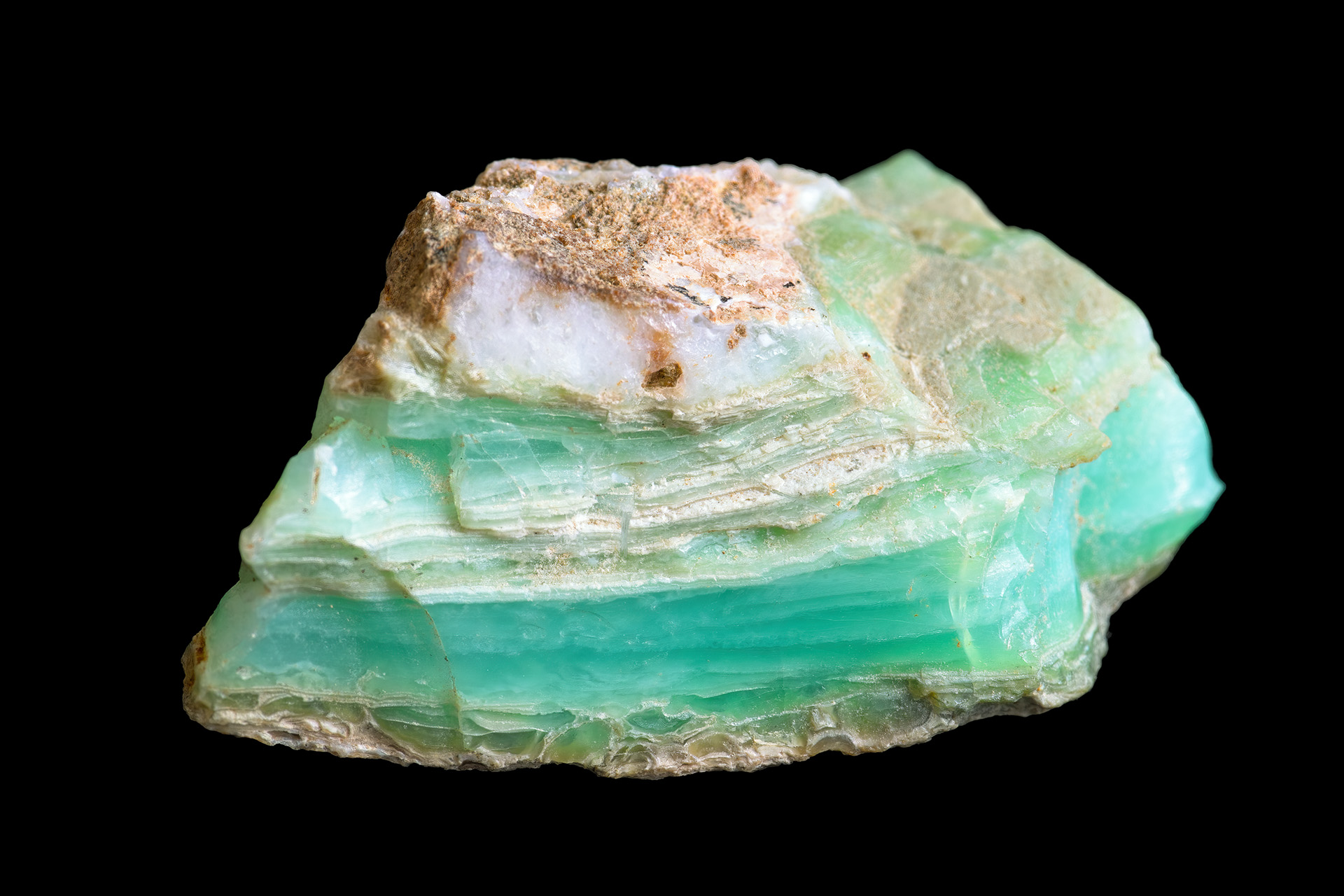
Chrysoprase

Chrysoprase (also spelled chrysophrase) is a green variety of chalcedony, which has been colored by nickel oxide. (The darker varieties of chrysoprase are also referred to as prase. However, the term prase is also used to describe green quartz and to a certain extent is a color-descriptor, rather than a rigorously defined mineral variety.)

=== Fire agate ===
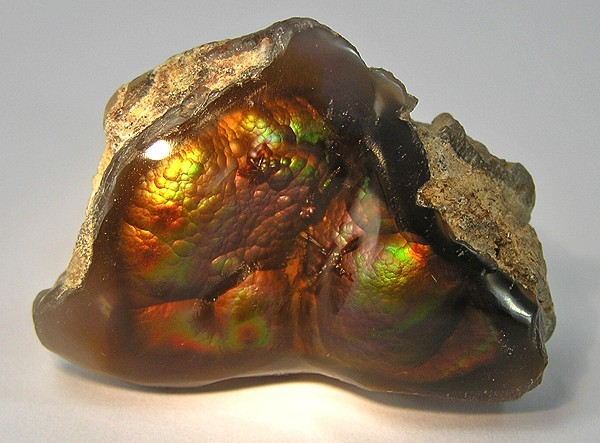
Fire agate

Fire agate is a variety of chalcedony with inclusions of goethite or limonite causing an iridescent effect. It can display a wide range of iridescent colors including red, orange, yellow, green, blue, and purple.

=== Heliotrope ===
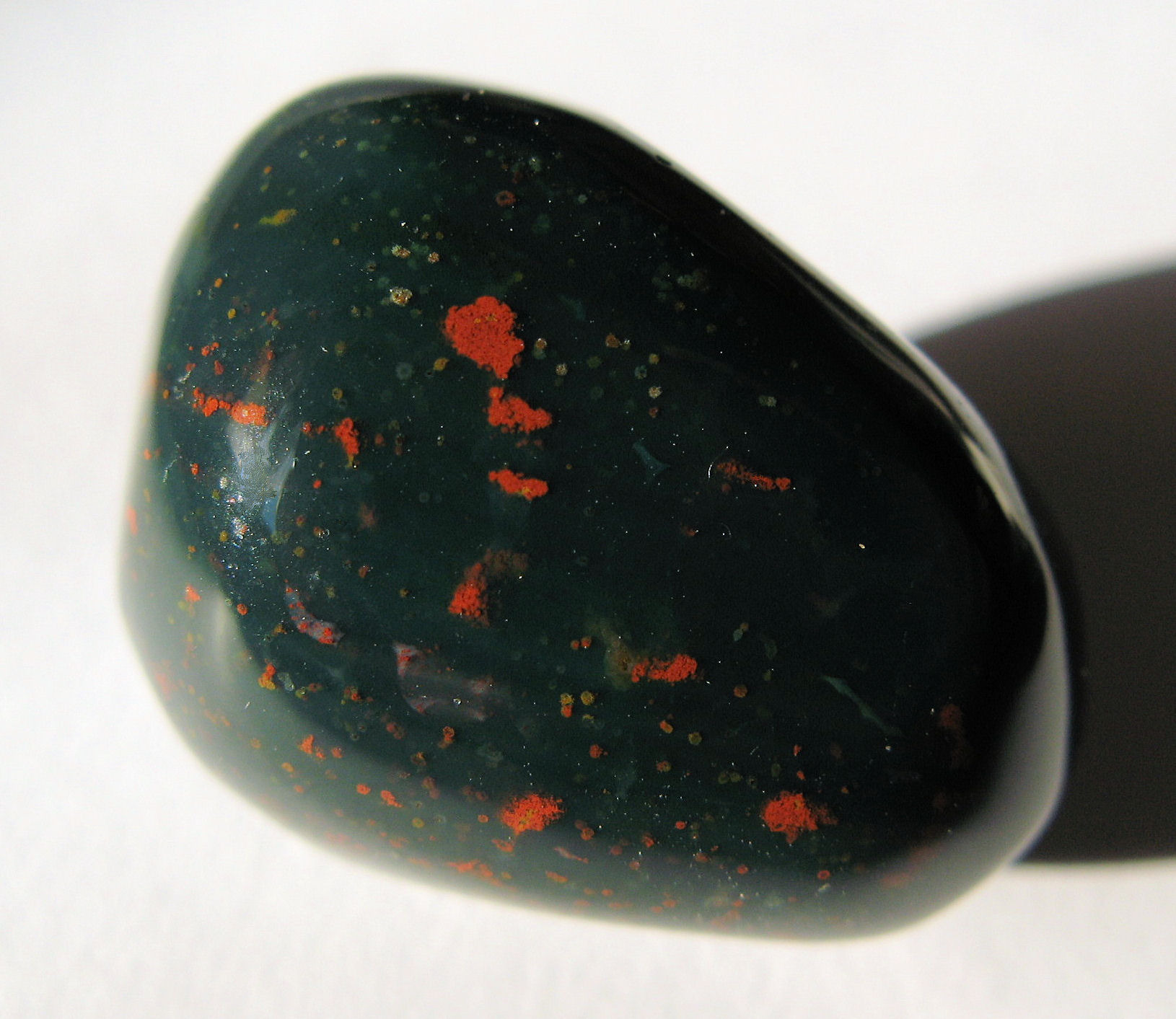
Heliotrope, or bloodstone

Heliotrope is a green variety of chalcedony, containing red inclusions of iron oxide that resemble drops of blood, giving heliotrope its alternative name of bloodstone. In a similar variety known as plasma, the spots are yellow instead.

=== Moss agate ===
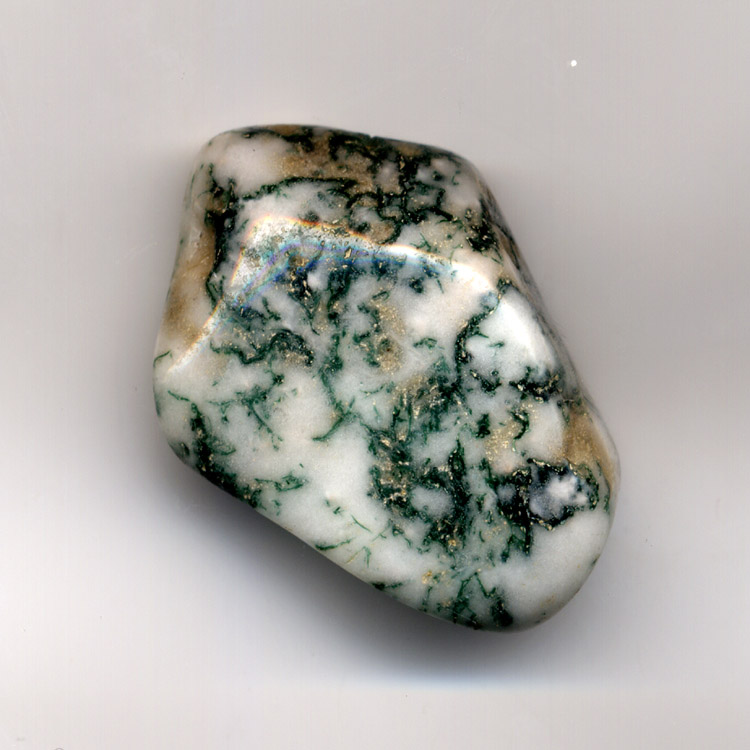
Tree agate

Moss agate contains green filament-like inclusions, giving it the superficial appearance of moss or blue cheese. There is also tree agate which is similar to moss agate except it is solid white with green filaments whereas moss agate usually has a transparent background, so the "moss" appears in 3D. It is not a true form of agate, as it lacks agate's defining feature of concentric banding.

=== Chrome chalcedony ===
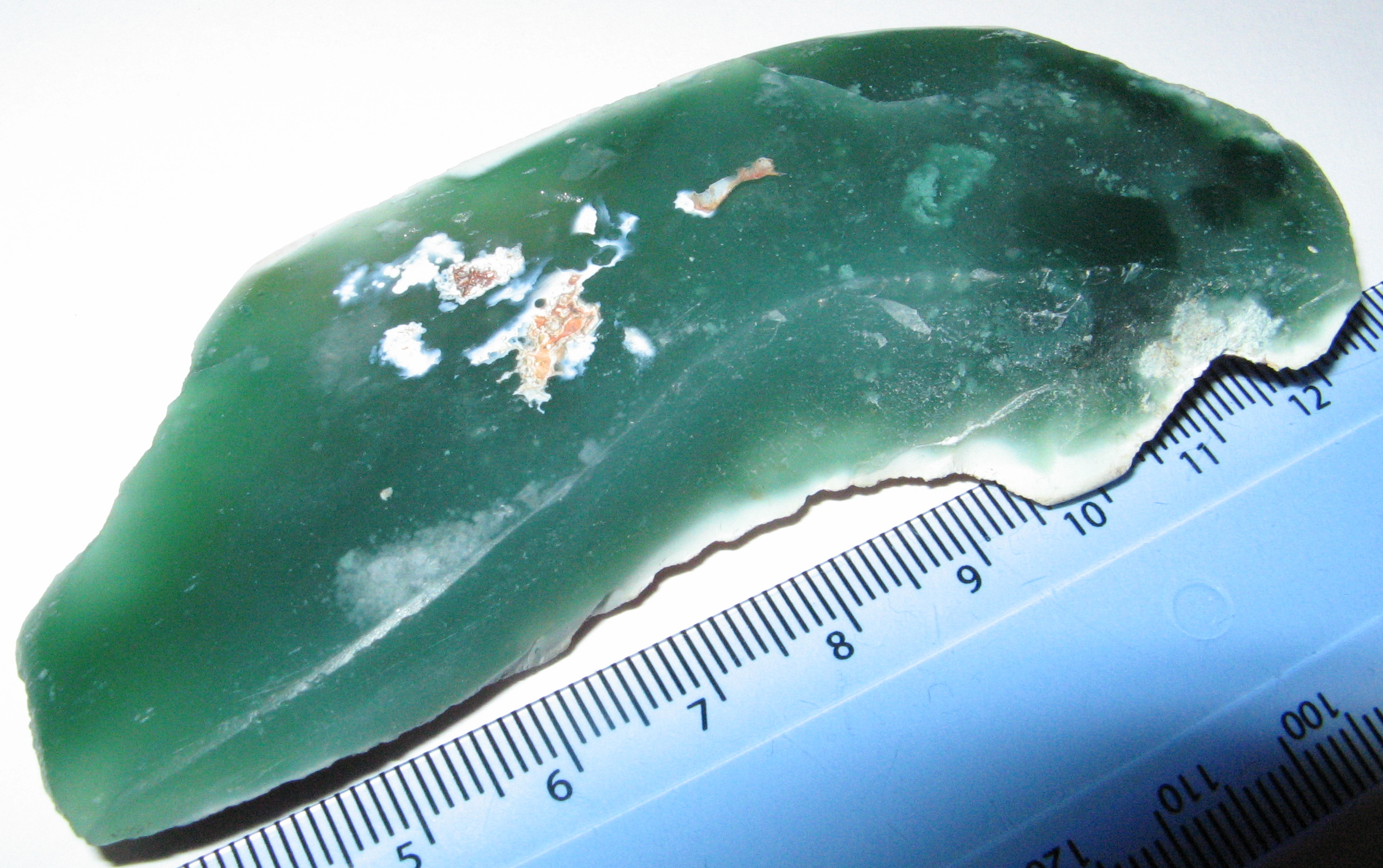
Mtorolite

Chrome chalcedony is a green variety of chalcedony, which is colored by chromium compounds. It is also known as "mtorolite" when found in Zimbabwe and "chiquitanita" when found in Bolivia.

=== Onyx ===
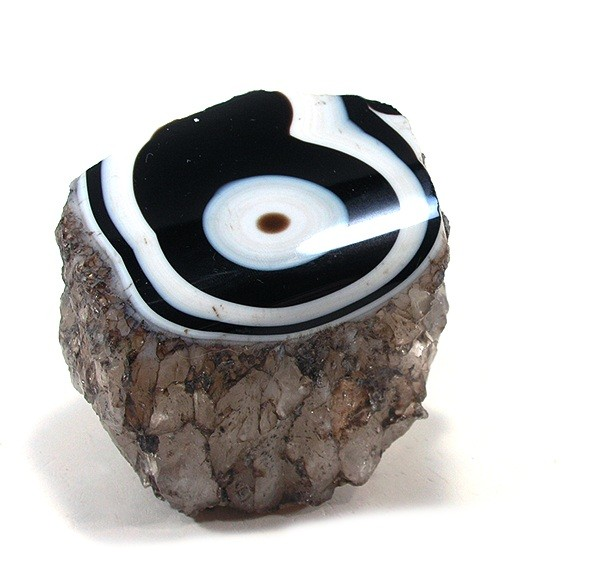
Onyx

Onyx is a variant of agate with black and white banding. Similarly, agate with brown, orange, red and white banding is known as sardonyx.

== History ==
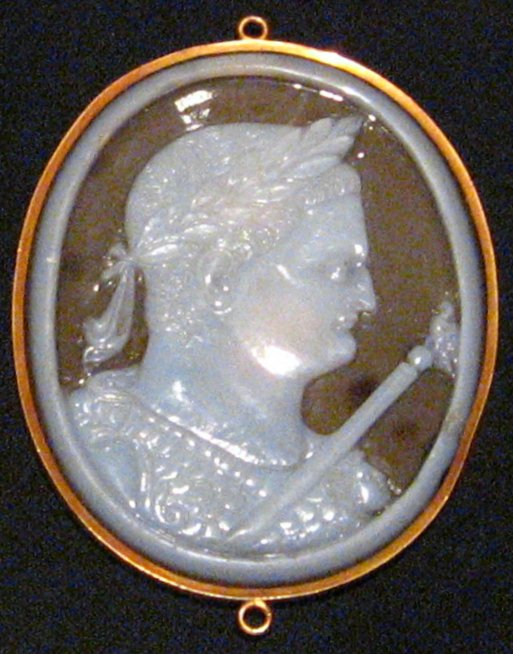
Chalcedony cameo of Titus head, 2nd century AD

Chalcedony was used in tool making as early as c. 32,000 BP in Central Australia where archaeological studies at sites in the Cleland Hills uncovered flakes from stone brought in from quarries many kilometres away. Pre-contact uses described in the twentieth century included ceremonial stone knives.

Chalcedony was used for green and yellow color in prehistoric cave paintings, for example at the Bhimbetka rock shelters. The chalcedony was ground to powder form then mixed with water and animal fat or tree resin or gum.

In the Bronze Age chalcedony was in use in the Mediterranean region; for example, on Minoan Crete at the Palace of Knossos, chalcedony seals have been recovered dating to circa 1800 BC. People living along the Central Asian trade routes used various forms of chalcedony, including carnelian, to carve intaglios, ring bezels (the upper faceted portion of a gem projecting from the ring setting), and beads that show strong Greco-Roman influence.

Fine examples of first century objects made from chalcedony, possibly Kushan, were found in recent years at Tillya-tepe in north-western Afghanistan. Hot wax would not stick to it so it was often used to make seal impressions. The term chalcedony is derived from the name of the ancient Greek town Chalkedon in Asia Minor, in modern English usually spelled Chalcedon, today the Kadıköy district of Istanbul.

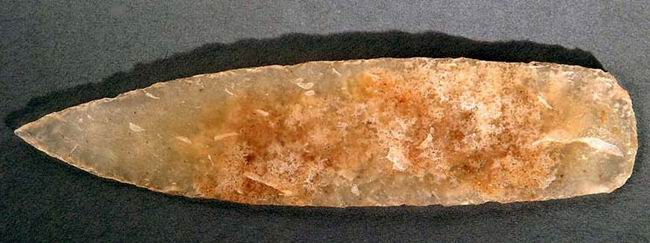
Chalcedony knife, AD 1000–1200

According to tradition, at least three varieties of chalcedony were used in the Jewish High Priest's Breastplate. (Jewish tradition states that Moses' brother Aaron wore the Breastplate, with inscribed gems representing the twelve tribes of Israel.) The Breastplate supposedly included jasper, chrysoprase and sardonyx, and there is some debate as to whether other agates were also used.

== See also ==
- List of minerals
