= Moganite =

Silica mineral, rare monoclinic polymorph of quartz

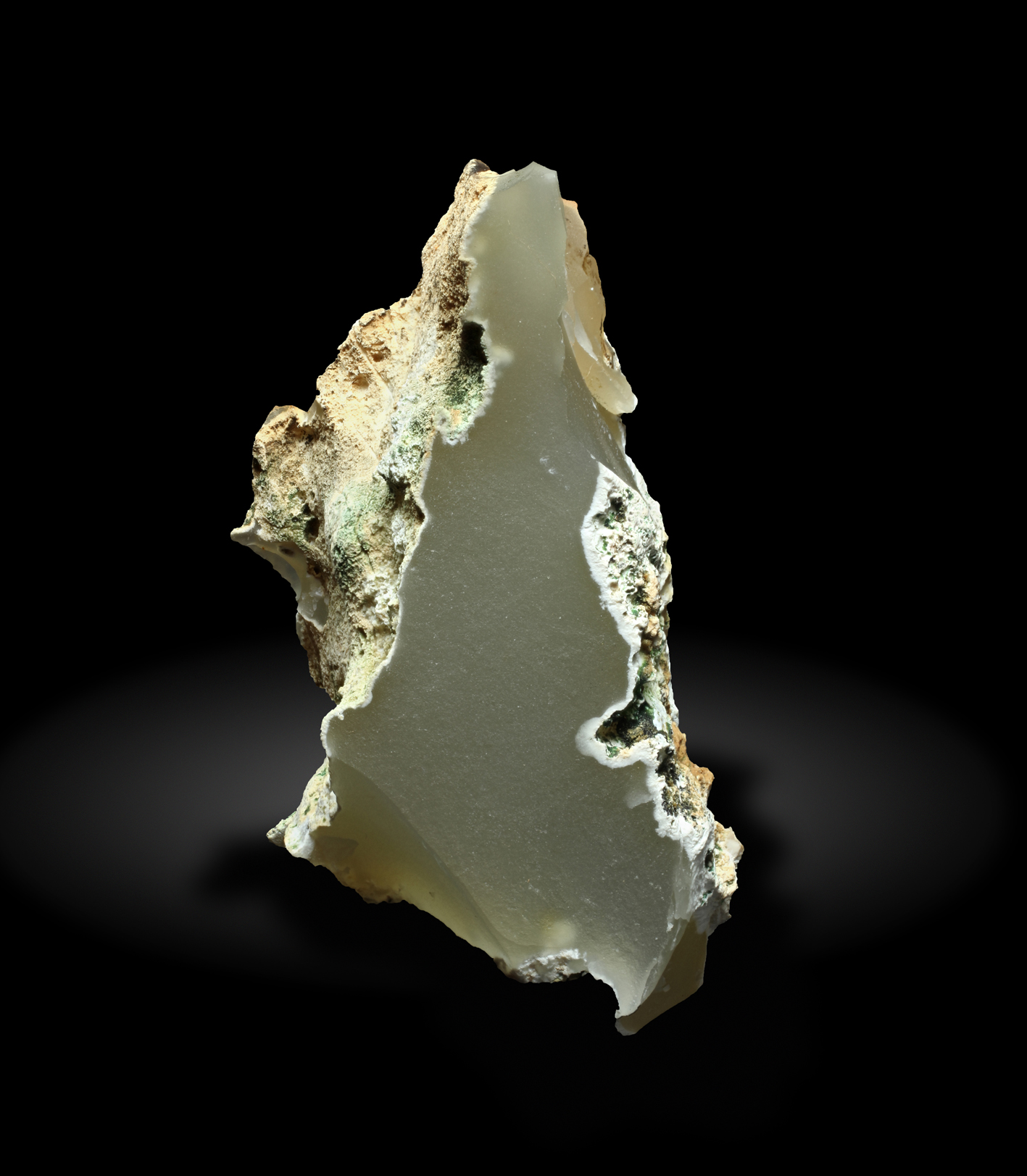
- Moganite. Medio Almud ravine, Mogán, Gran Canaria, Spain. Height 5cm.

General
- Category: Tectosilicate minerals
- Group: Quartz group
- Formula: SiO_{2}
- IMA symbol: Mog
- Strunz classification: 4.DA.20
- Dana classification: 75.01.04.02
- Crystal system: Monoclinic
- Crystal class: Prismatic (2/m) (same H–M symbol)
- Space group: I2/a

Identification
- Color: Grey
- Crystal habit: Massive
- Mohs scale hardness: 6
- Luster: Earthy, dull
- Streak: White
- Diaphaneity: Transparent
- Specific gravity: 2.52 – 2.58
- Optical properties: Biaxial
- Refractive index: n_{α} = 1.524 n_{γ} = 1.531

Moganite is a tectosilicate mineral with the chemical formula SiO_{2} (silicon dioxide) that was discovered in 1976. The mineral was initially described as a new form of silica, on the basis of specimens found in the Barranco de Medio Almud ravine. This ravine is in the municipality of Mogán, on the island of Gran Canaria, in the Canary Islands region of Spain. In later work, the mineral derived its name from this locality. In 1994, the International Mineralogical Association (IMA) disapproved moganite as a valid mineral, since it was considered to be indistinguishable from quartz. Subsequent studies allowed the IMA to correct this in 1999, accepting moganite as a mineral species. It has the same chemical composition as quartz, but a different crystal structure.

Moganite has been mainly found in dry locales such as Gran Canaria and Lake Magadi. It has been reported from a variety of locations in Europe, India and the United States. Physically, it has a Mohs hardness of about 6, a dull luster, and a semitransparent gray color.

== Structural information ==
The main infrared spectroscopy (IR) differences between moganite and α-quartz occur in the wavenumber region below 650 cm^{−1}. Above this wavenumber, the frequencies of Si–O stretching vibrations of moganite are almost identical to those of quartz. Additional moganite bands were recorded near 165, 207, 296, 343, 419, 576, and 612 cm^{−1}.

== Structural phase transition ==
Synchrotron X-ray powder diffraction data for moganite from 100 to 1,354 K (−173 to 1,081 °C) has revealed a reversible phase transition from space group I2/a to Imab at approximately 570 K (297 °C). The in-situ Fourier transform infrared spectroscopy shows that while the thermal responses of H_{2}O and OH in moganite display similarities to agate, the spectra are not completely identical. Absorptions in the O–H stretching region reveal that the process of dehydration and dehydroxylation has multiple stages. Although hydrogen loss starts below 400–500 K (127–227 °C), hydrous species may well remain in moganite even at 1,060 K (790 °C).
