= Birthstone =

Gemstone representing a person's birth month

A birthstone is a gemstone that represents a person's birth period, usually the month. Birthstones are often worn as jewelry or a pendant necklace.

== History ==
=== Western custom ===
The first-century historian Josephus believed there was a connection between the twelve stones in Aaron's breastplate (signifying the Twelve Tribes of Israel, as described in the Book of Exodus), the twelve months of the year, and the twelve signs of the zodiac. Translations and interpretations of the passage in Exodus regarding the breastplate have varied widely, with Josephus himself giving two different lists for the twelve stones. George Frederick Kunz argues that Josephus saw the breastplate of the Second Temple, not the one described in Exodus. St. Jerome, referencing Josephus, said the Foundation Stones of the New Jerusalem (Revelation 21:19–20) would be appropriate for Christians.

In the eighth and ninth centuries, religious treatises associating a particular stone with an apostle were written so that "their name would be inscribed on the Foundation Stones, and his virtue." Practice became to keep twelve stones and wear one a month. The custom of wearing a single birthstone is only a few centuries old, though modern authorities differ on dates. Kunz places the custom in eighteenth-century Poland, while the Gemological Institute of America starts it in Germany in the 1560s.

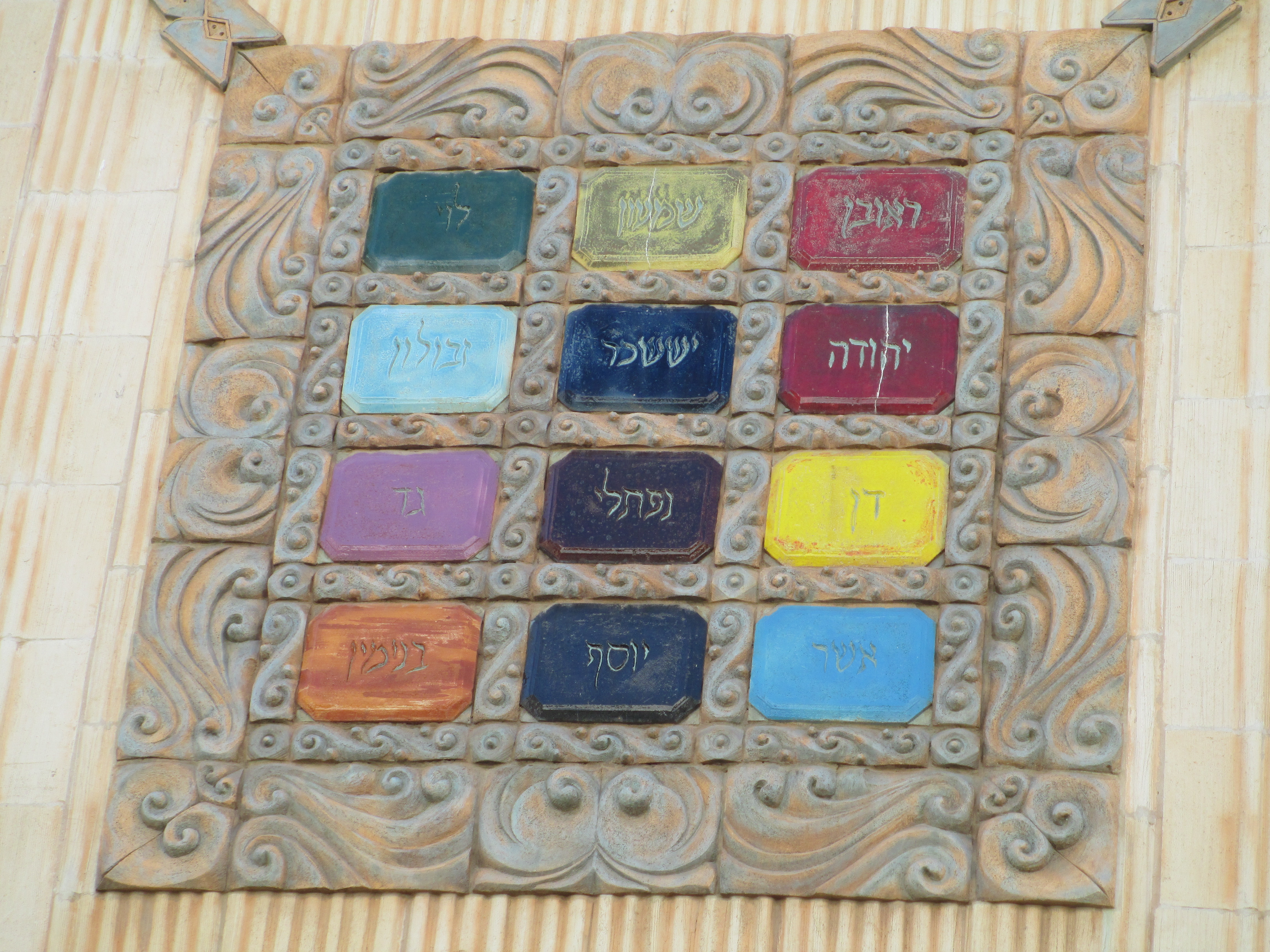
Recreation of the high priest's breastplate in front of the central Sephardic synagogue in Ramat Gan, Israel

Modern lists of birthstones have little to do with either the breastplate or the Foundation Stones of Christianity. Tastes, customs, and confusing translations have distanced them from their historical origins, with one author calling the 1912 Kansas list (see below) "nothing but a piece of unfounded salesmanship."

Some poems match each month of the Gregorian calendar with a birthstone. These are traditional stones of English-speaking societies. Tiffany & Co. published these poems "of unknown author" for the first time in a pamphlet in 1870.

==== Modern birthstones ====
In August 1912, to standardize birthstones, the (American) National Association of Jewelers (now called Jewelers of America) met in Kansas City and officially adopted a list. The Jewelry Industry Council of America updated the list in 1952 by adding alexandrite for June, citrine for November and pink tourmaline for October. They also replaced December's lapis lazuli with zircon and switched the primary/alternative gems for March. The American Gem Trade Association added tanzanite as a December birthstone in 2002. In 2016, the American Gem Trade Association and Jewelers of America added spinel as an additional birthstone for August. Britain's National Association of Goldsmiths created its own standardized list of birthstones in 1937. In 2021, Japanese industry associations added ten new types of birthstones.

=== Hindu tradition ===
Hinduism recognizes a similar range of gemstones associated with birth, though rather than associating a gem with a birth month, gemstones are associated with celestial bodies. Astrology determines the gemstones most closely associated with and beneficial to a particular individual. There are nine gemstones related to the Navagraha (celestial forces including the planets, the Sun, and the Moon), known in Sanskrit as Navaratna (nine gems). At birth, an astrological chart is calculated. Specific stones are recommended to be worn on the body to supposedly ward off potential problems based on the place of these forces in the sky at the exact place and time of birth.

== Birthstones by time frame ==
Month	15th–20th century	U.S. (1912)	UK (2013)	U.S. (2019)
January	Garnet	Garnet	Garnet	Garnet
February	Amethyst, hyacinth, pearl	Amethyst	Amethyst	Amethyst
March	Bloodstone, jasper	Bloodstone, aquamarine	Aquamarine, bloodstone	Aquamarine, bloodstone
April	Diamond, sapphire	Diamond	Diamond, rock crystal	Diamond
May	Emerald, agate	Emerald	Emerald, chrysoprase	Emerald
June	Cat's eye, turquoise, agate	Pearl, moonstone	Pearl, moonstone	Pearl, moonstone, alexandrite
July	Turquoise, onyx	Ruby	Ruby, carnelian	Ruby
August	Sardonyx, carnelian, moonstone, topaz	Sardonyx, peridot	Peridot, sardonyx	Peridot, spinel, sardonyx
September	Chrysolite	Sapphire	Sapphire, lapis lazuli	Sapphire
October	Opal, aquamarine	Opal, tourmaline	Opal	Opal, tourmaline
November	Topaz, pearl	Topaz	Topaz, citrine	Topaz, citrine
December	Bloodstone, ruby	Turquoise, lapis lazuli	Tanzanite, turquoise	Turquoise, zircon, tanzanite

== Zodiacal ==
=== Tropical zodiac ===
Sign	Dates	Stone
Aries	21 March – 19 April	Bloodstone
Taurus	20 April – 20 May	Sapphire
Gemini	21 May – 20 June	Agate
Cancer	21 June – 22 July	Emerald
Leo	23 July – 22 August	Onyx
Virgo	23 August – 22 September	Carnelian
Libra	23 September – 22 October	Chrysolite
Scorpio	23 October – 21 November	Beryl
Sagittarius	22 November – 21 December	Topaz
Capricorn	22 December – 19 January	Ruby
Aquarius	20 January – 18 February	Garnet
Pisces	19 February – 20 March	Amethyst

== Birthday (day of the week) stones ==
While the term "birthday stone" is sometimes used as a synonym for a birthstone, each day of the week is also assigned a unique gemstone, and these assignments are distinct from the monthly assignments.

Day of the Week	Stones
Sunday	Topaz, diamond
Monday	Pearl, crystal
Tuesday	Ruby, emerald
Wednesday	Amethyst, lodestone
Thursday	Sapphire, carnelian
Friday	Emerald, cat's eye
Saturday	Turquoise, diamond

== Gallery ==
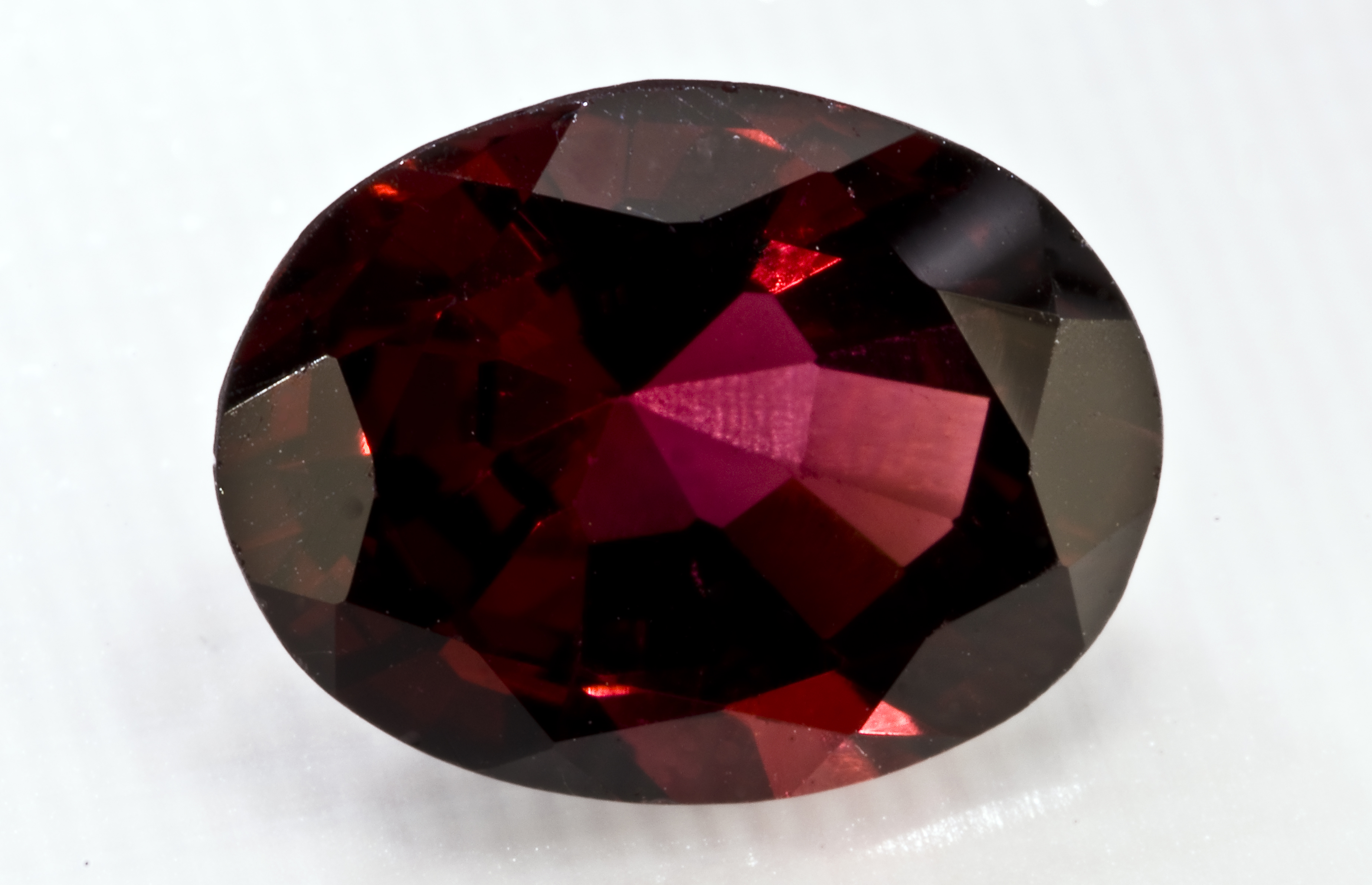
Garnet, the birthstone for January

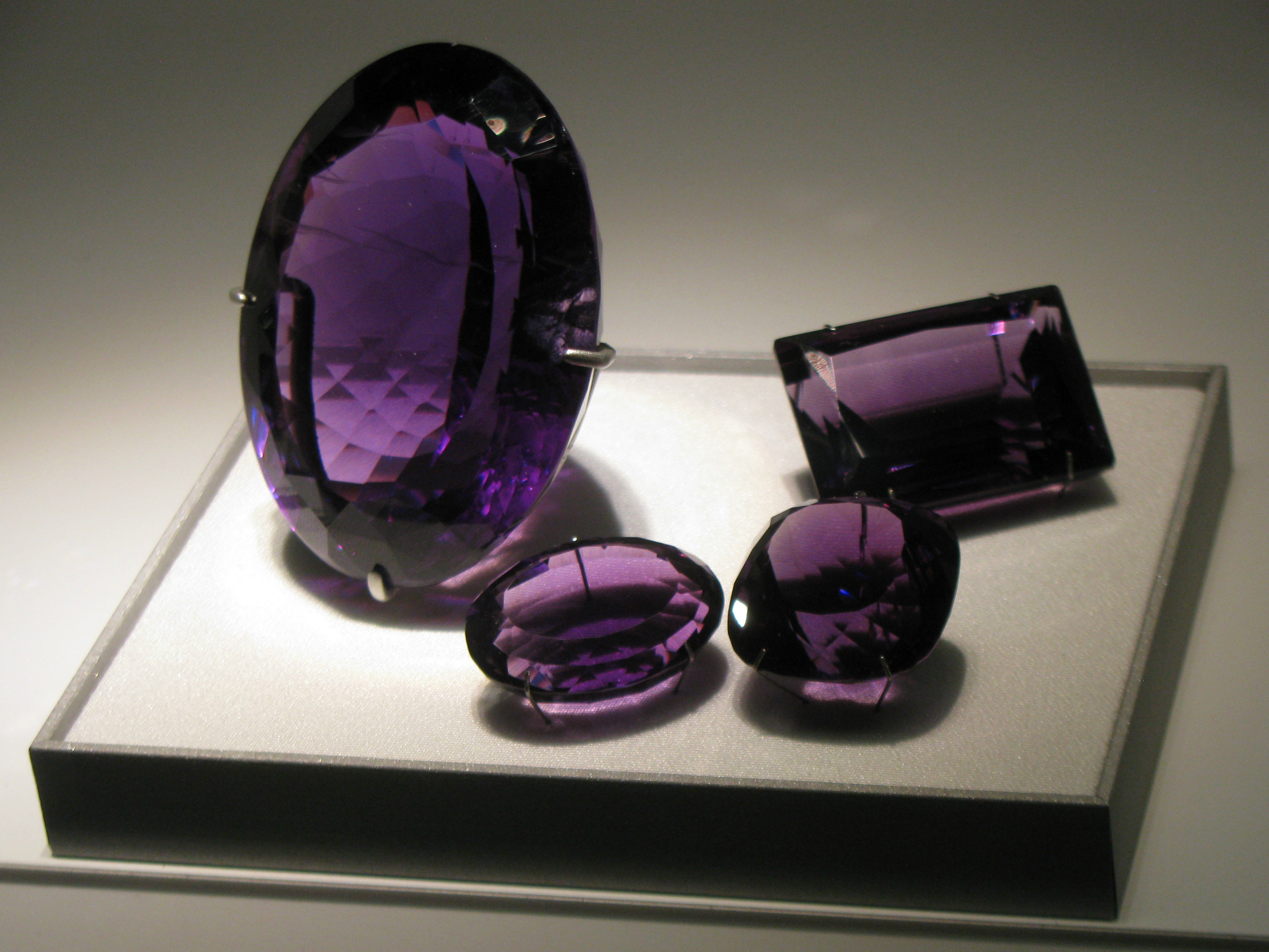
Amethyst, the birthstone for February

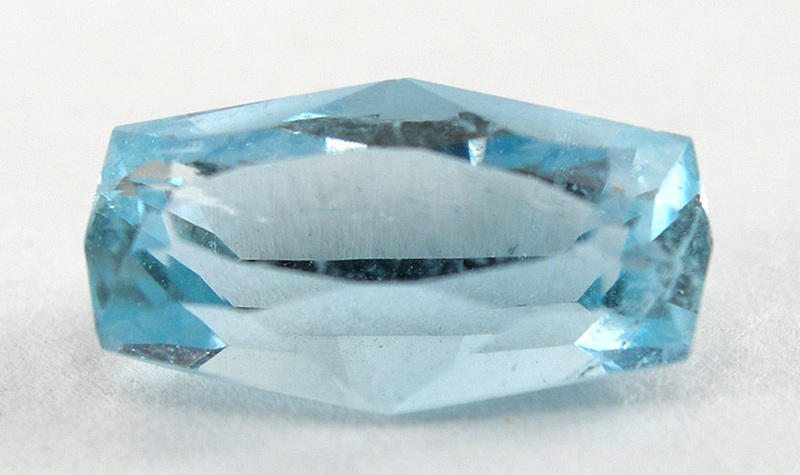
Aquamarine, the birthstone for March

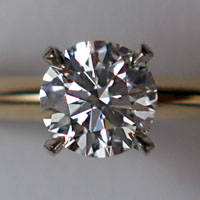
Diamond, the birthstone for April

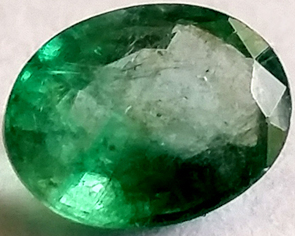
Emerald, the birthstone for May

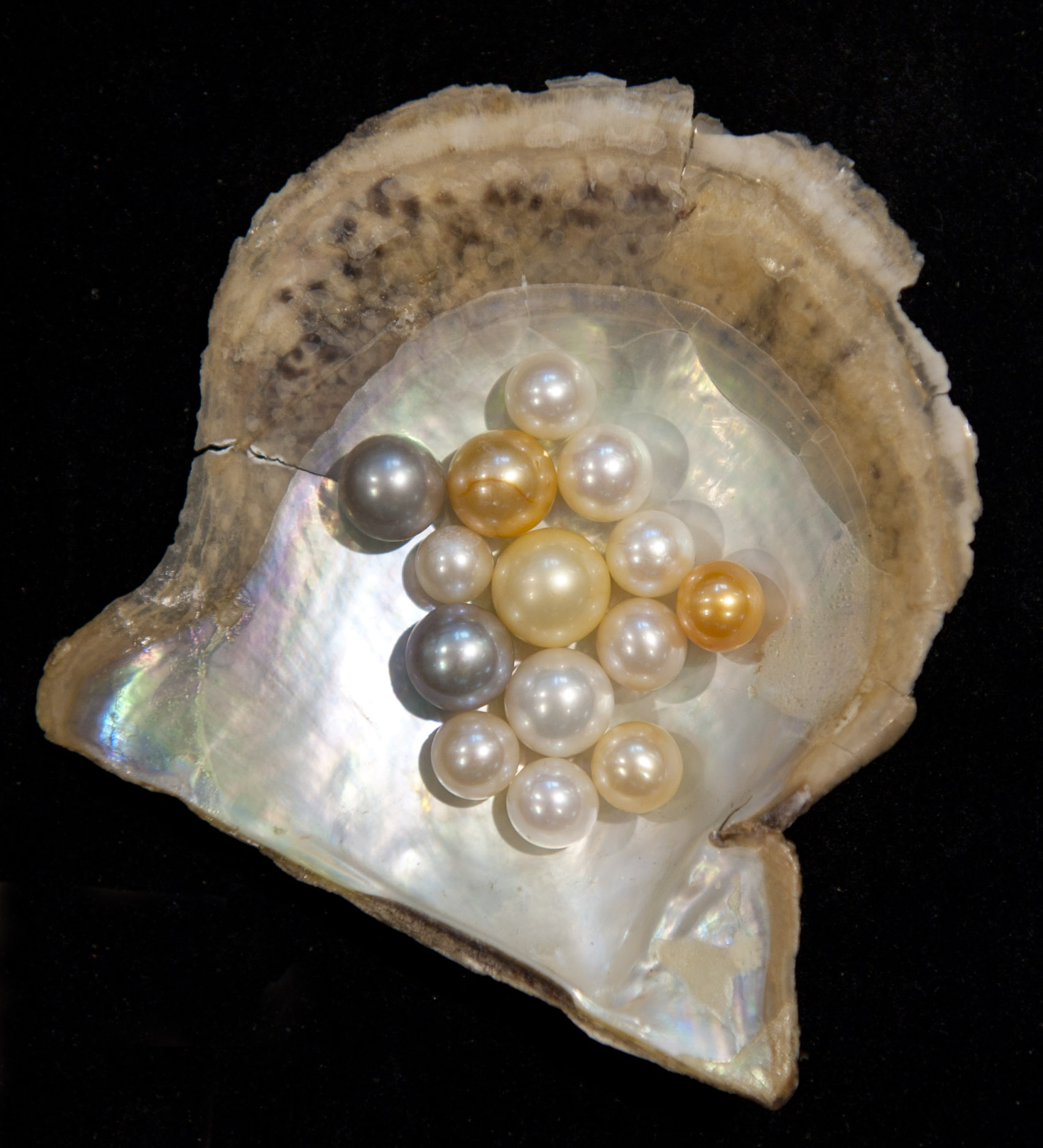
Pearl, one of three June birthstones

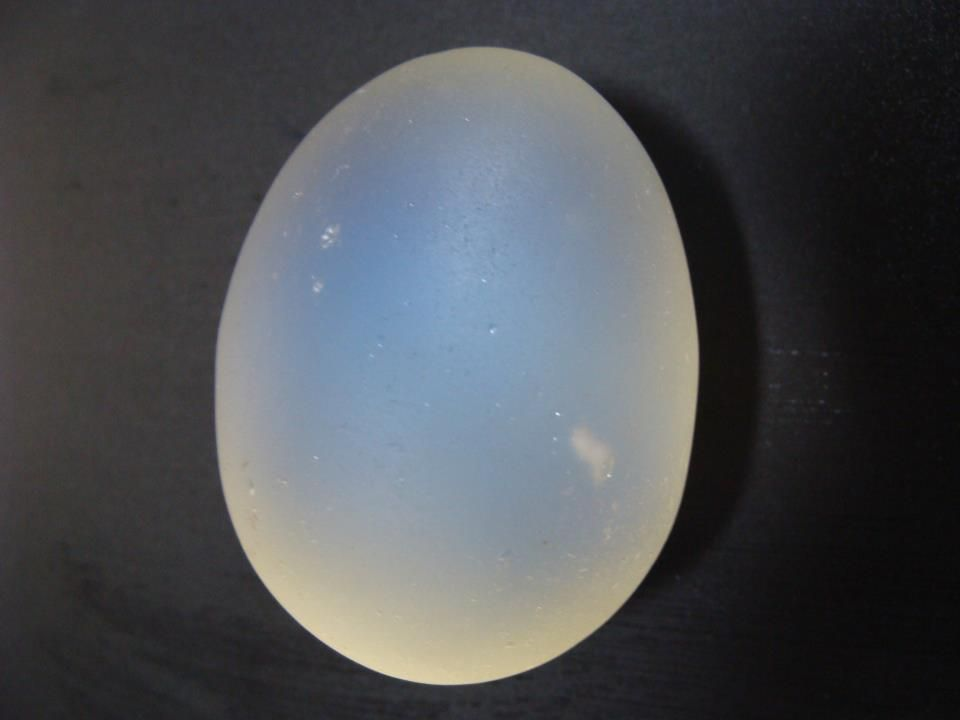
Moonstone, one of three June birthstones

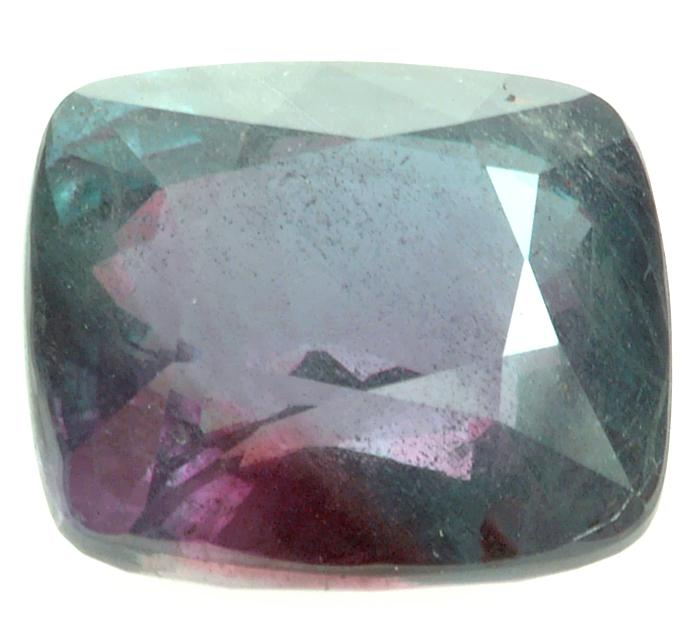
Alexandrite, one of three June birthstones

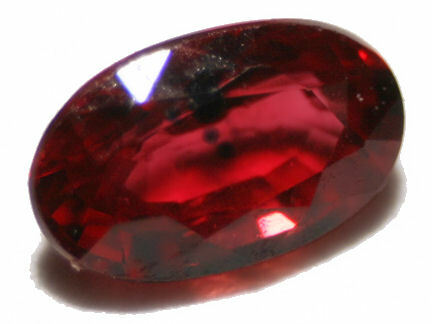
Ruby, the birthstone for July

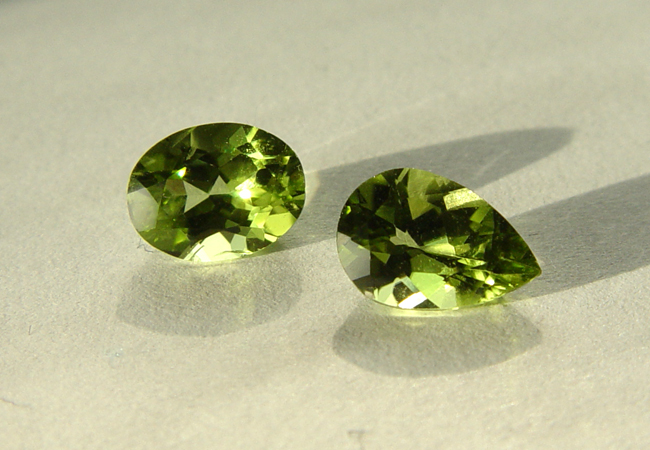
Peridot, the modern birthstone for August

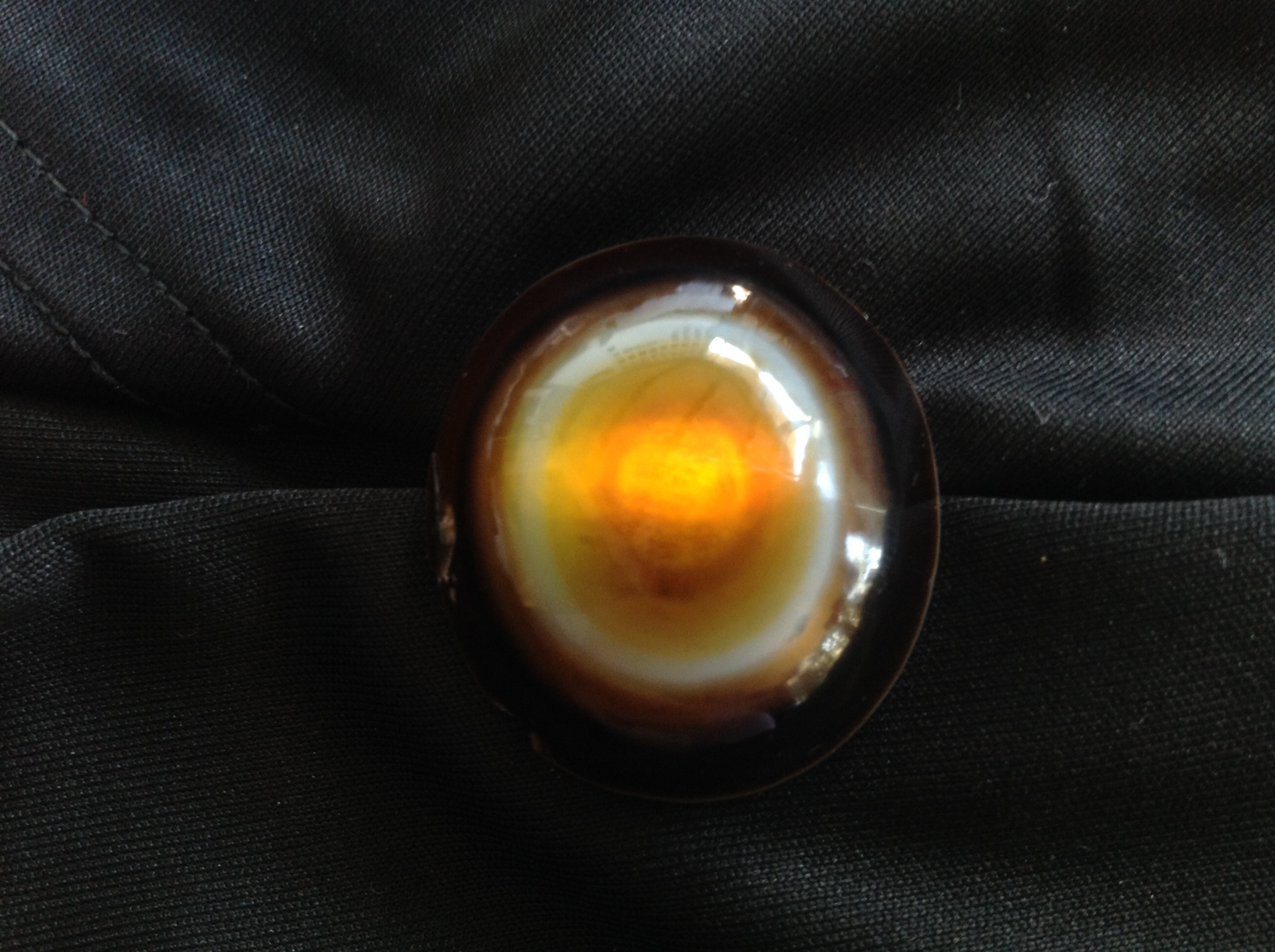
Sardonyx, the traditional birthstone for August

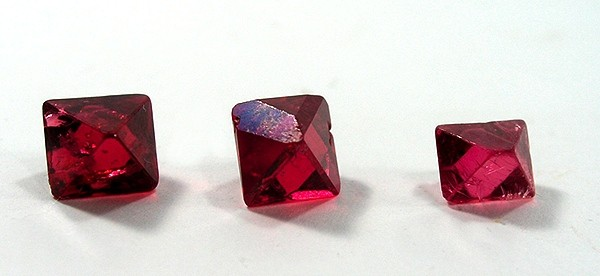
Spinel, a more recent (2019) alternative birthstone for August

Sapphire, the birthstone for September

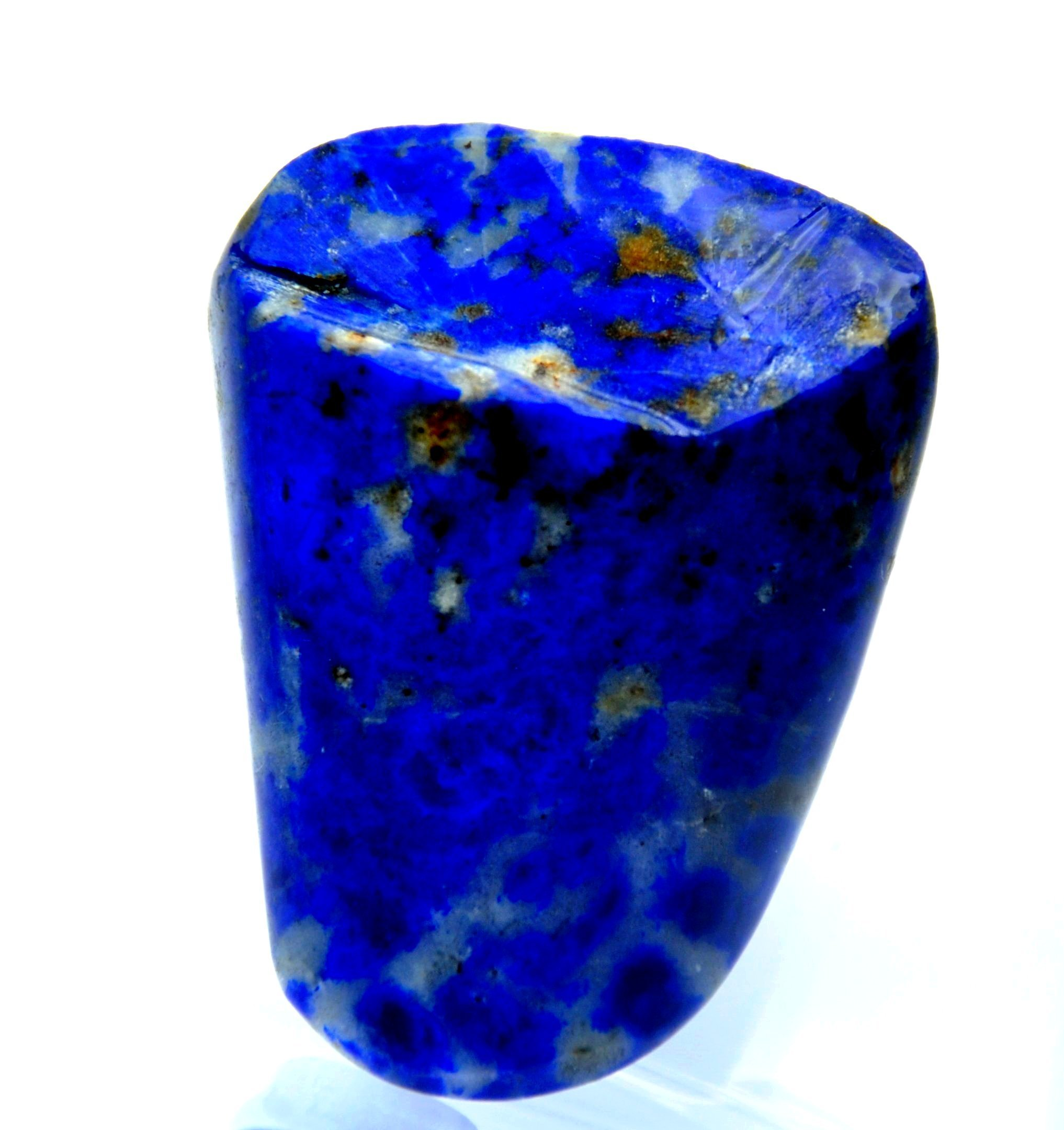
Lapis lazuli, the traditional birthstone for September

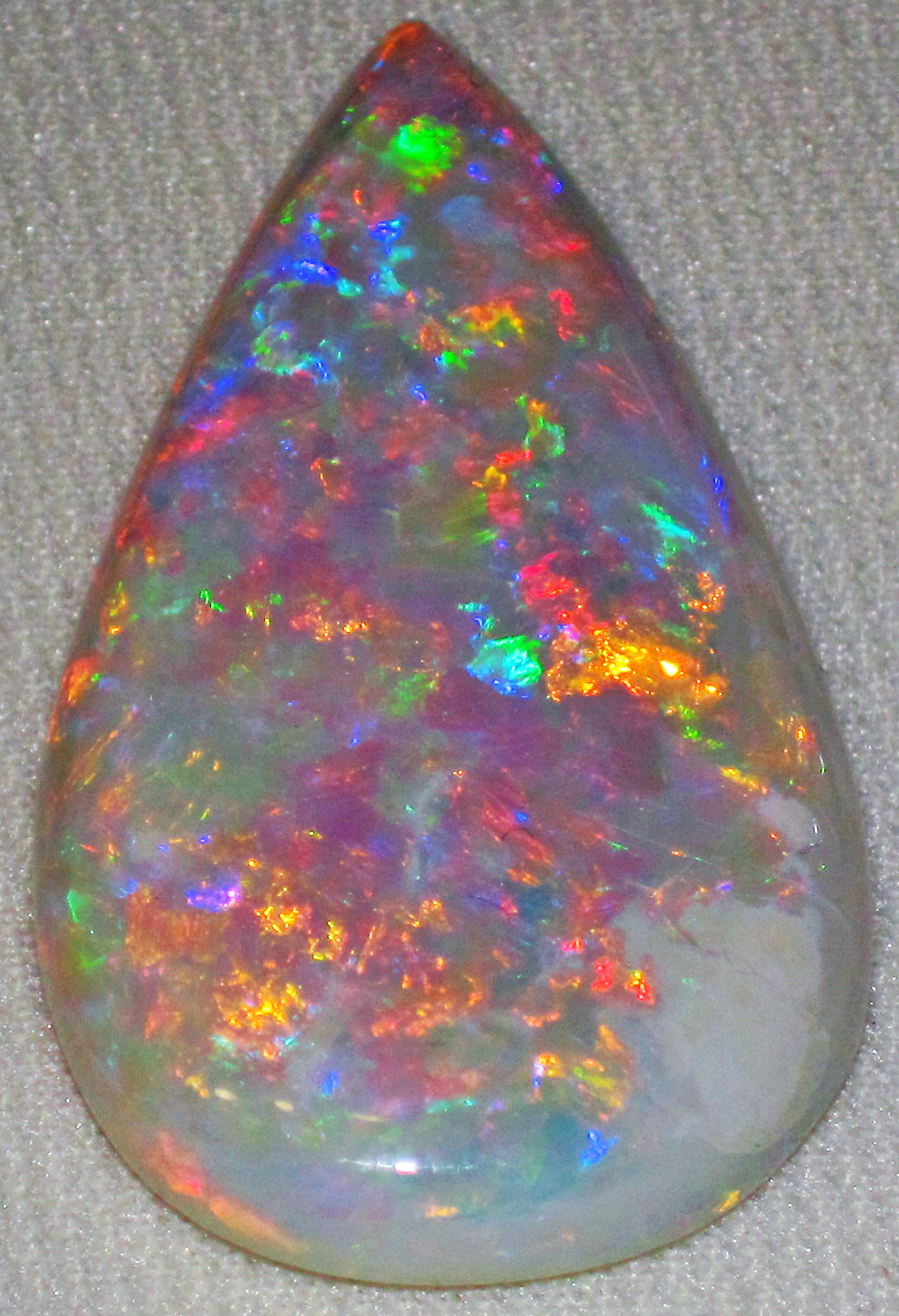
Opal, one of two October birthstones

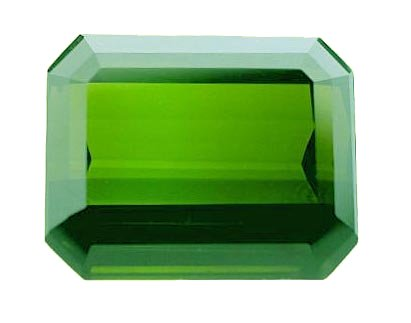
Tourmaline, one of two October birthstones

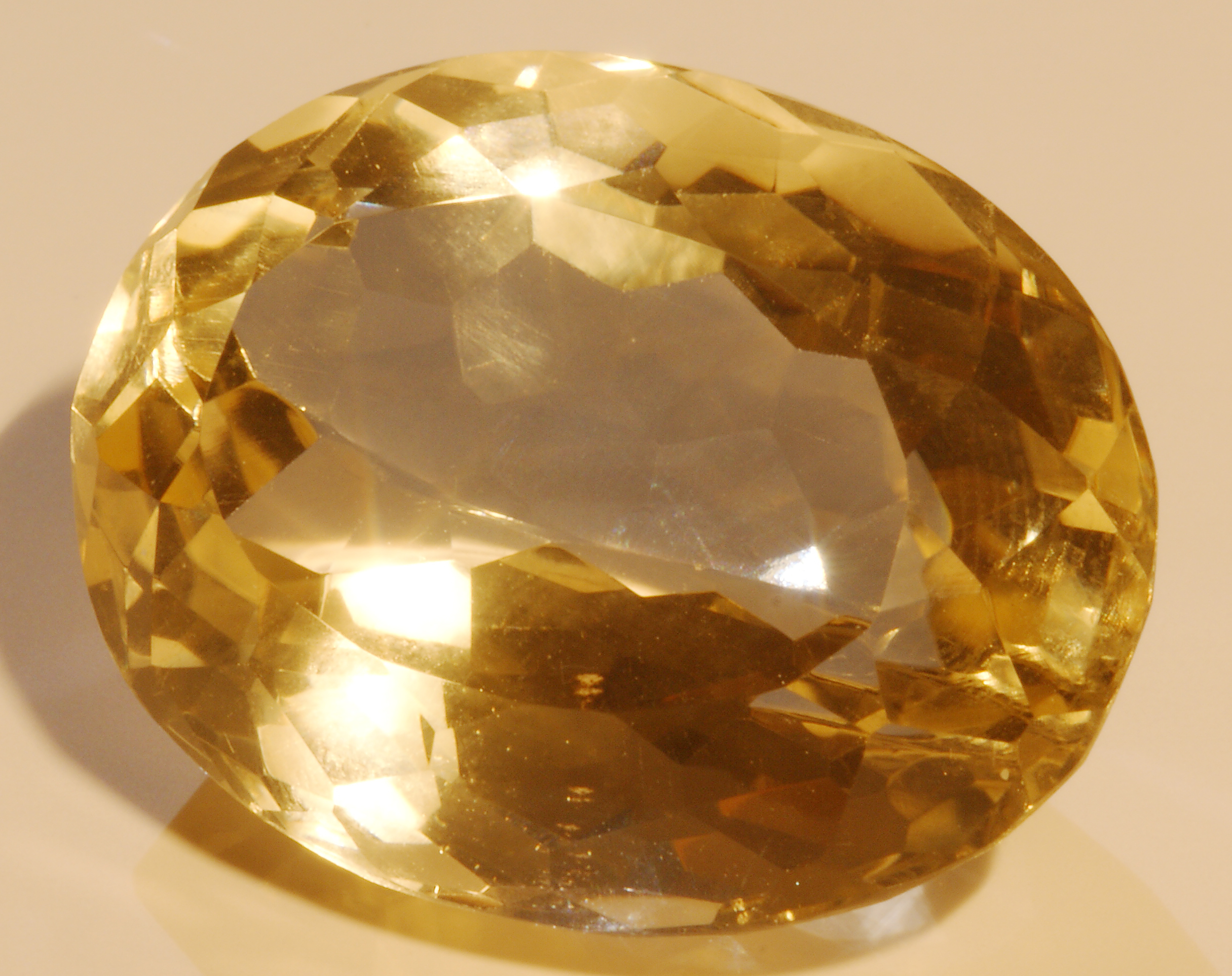
Citrine, one of two November birthstones

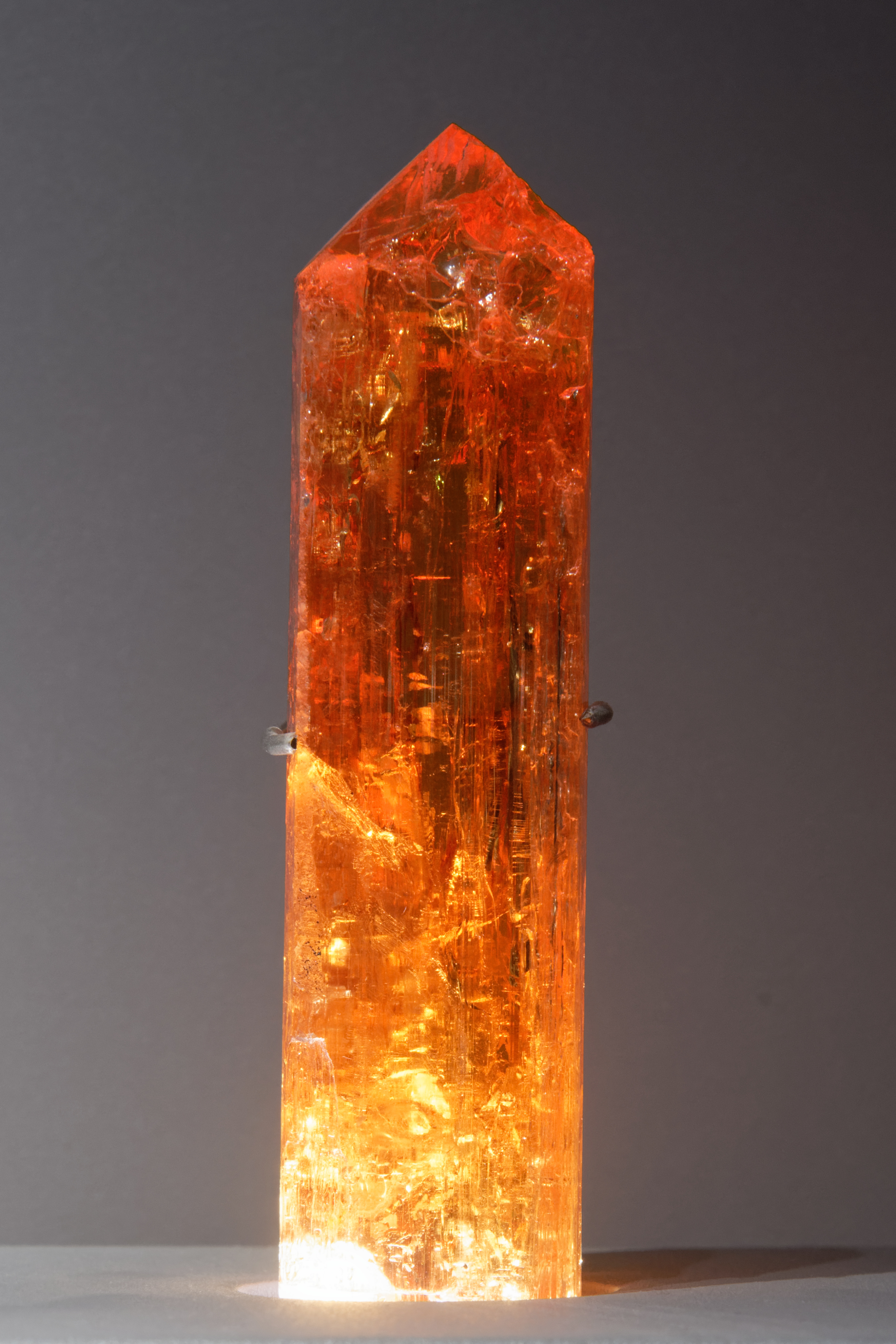
Topaz, one of two November birthstones

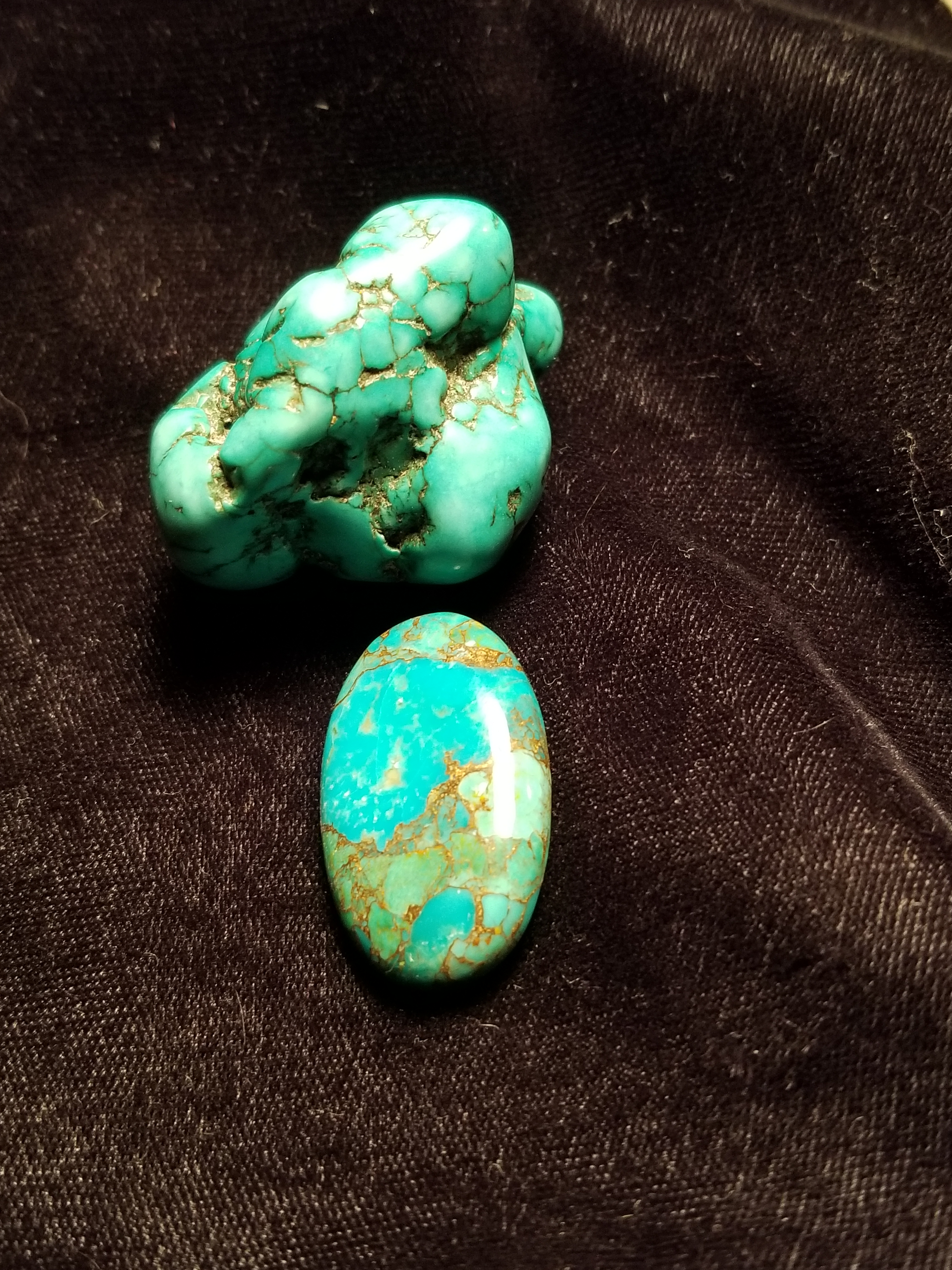
Turquoise, one of three December birthstones

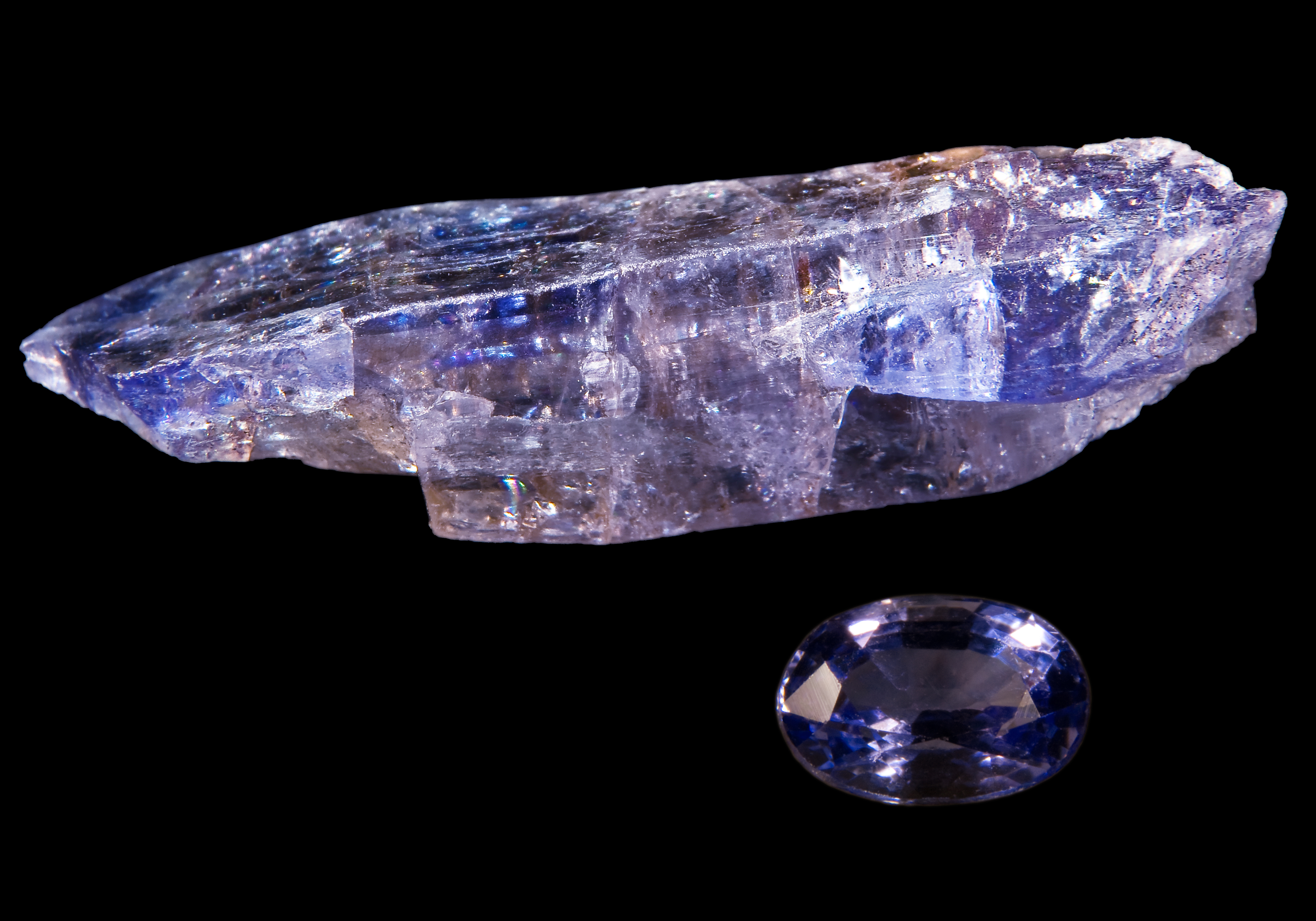
Tanzanite, one of three December birthstones

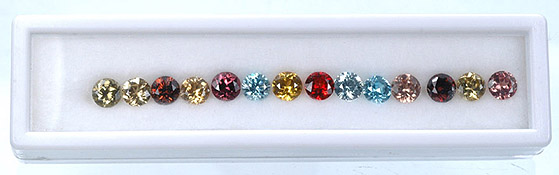
Zircon, one of three December birthstones

== See also ==
- Birth flower
