= Chrysocolla (gold-solder) =

Historical term for gold-solder

Chrysocolla (gold-solder, Greek χρῡσόκολλα; Latin chrȳsocolla, oerugo, santerna; Syriac "tankar" (Bar Bahlul), alchemical symbol 🜸), also known as "goldsmith's solder" and "solder of Macedonia" (Pseudo-Democritus), denotes:

- The soldering of gold.
- The materials used for soldering gold and certain gold alloys still used by goldsmiths.
- A mix of copper and iron salts produced by the dissolution of a metallic vein by water.
- Malachite (green carbonate of copper), and other alkaline copper salts of green colour.
- Greenish copper salts obtained by boiling infant's urine and natron in copper vessels.
- A particular copper hydrosilicate is named chrysocolla by modern mineralogists.

== See also ==
- Chrysoberyl
- Chrysolite
- Chrysoprase
- Chrysotile
- Sarcocolla
