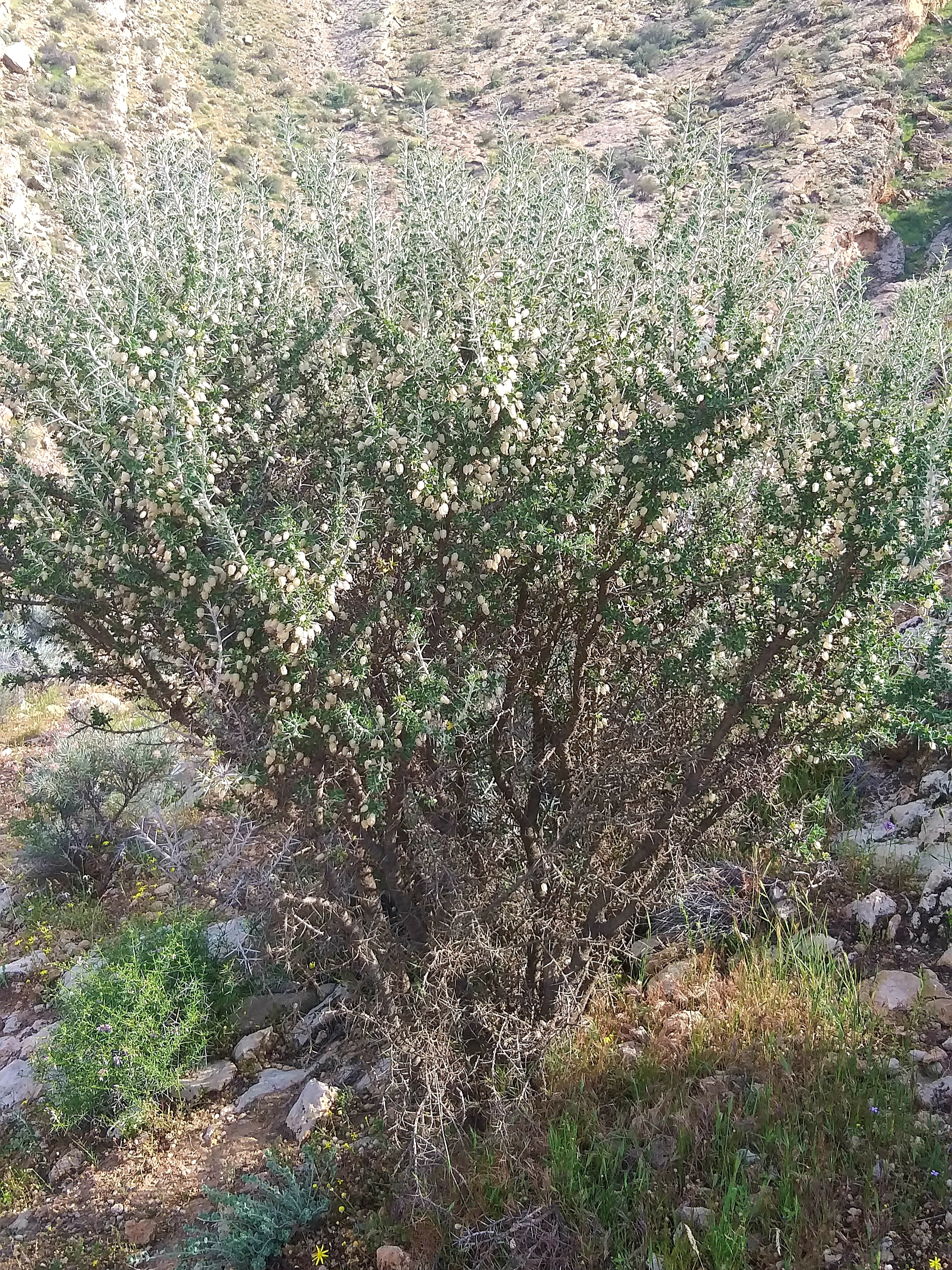

Scientific classification
- Kingdom: Plantae
- Clade: Tracheophytes
- Clade: Angiosperms
- Clade: Eudicots
- Clade: Rosids
- Order: Fabales
- Family: Fabaceae
- Subfamily: Faboideae
- Genus: Astragalus
- Species: A. sarcocolla

Binomial name
- Astragalus sarcocolla Dymock

= Astragalus sarcocolla =

Species of legume

Astragalus sarcocolla, also known as Persian gum, is a shrub or tree from Persia historically famed for its balsam, which was used to create ancient and medieval paint and in traditional medicines. Although its identity was uncertain to Europeans after it fell from use in the medieval period, it has since been identified with a species of Astragalus (Papilionaceae).

== Name ==
Sarcocolla is the latinized form of Greek sarkokólla (σαρκοκόλλα), from sárx (σάρξ, "flesh") and kólla (κόλλᾰ, "glue"). It is variously known in Arabic as anzarūṭ or ʿanzarūt, as Persian gum (kuḥl fārisī), and as Kerman gum (kuḥl kirmānī) and in Persian as anzarūt, as tasẖm or časẖm, and as kanḏjubā. The medieval Latin name of the product was acarud from corruption of the Andalusian Arabic form of anzarūṭ or ʿanzarūt, probably via Old Spanish.

== History ==
Pliny reports the use of sarcocolla in creating paints and as a medicine and Dioscorides and Galenus mention its power of healing wounds.

The 8th century philosopher Al-Kindi used sarcocolla for leprosy in his medical formulary Akrabadhin.

According to the c. 13th-century Liber Ignium ("Book of Fires") of Marcus Graecus, sarcocolla was an ingredient of Greek Fire.

The 16th-century surgeon Brunus of Calabria recommended a plaster for skull fractures consisting of sarcocolla, bitter vetch meal, dragon's blood, and myrrh.

== See also ==
- Chrysocolla ("gold solder")
- Sarcocele
