= Heliotrope (bloodstone) =

Green and red chalcedony or jasper

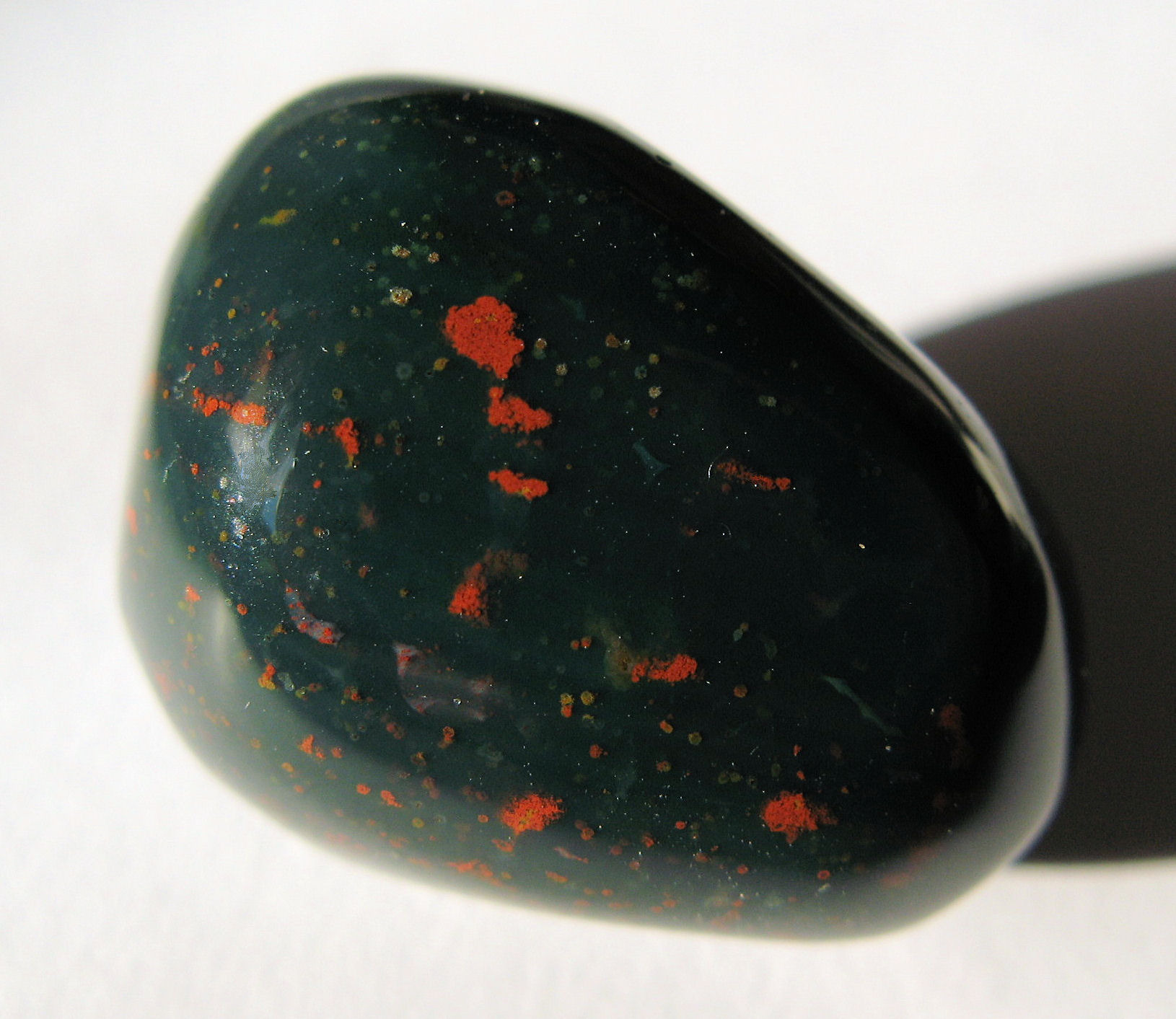
- A tumble-polished pebble of heliotrope, also called bloodstone

General
- Category: Tectosilicate minerals
- Group: Quartz group
- Formula: SiO_{2} (silicon dioxide)
- IMA status: Variety of chalcedony
- Crystal system: Trigonal (quartz), monoclinic (moganite)

Identification
- Color: Dark shades of green, often with red or yellow spots; sometimes mixed with whitish silica
- Fracture: Conchoidal
- Mohs scale hardness: 6.5–7
- Luster: Vitreous
- Diaphaneity: Opaque to translucent
- Specific gravity: 2.61
- Refractive index: 1.53–1.54
- Birefringence: 0.004

Heliotrope (from Ancient Greek ἥλιος (hḗlios) 'sun' and τρέπειν (trépein) 'to turn') (also called ematille, Indian bloodstone or simply bloodstone), is a mineral aggregate, a cryptocrystalline mixture of quartz that occurs mostly as jasper (opaque) or sometimes as chalcedony (translucent).

The "classic" bloodstone is translucent to opaque green chalcedony and red jasper that contains inclusions of hematite. The red jasper may resemble spots of blood, hence the name bloodstone. Other colors of chalcedony may also occur in Indian bloodstone, such as white, yellow, or blue.

This semiprecious stone should not be confused with other ornamental stones that contain red jasper. Setonite, also called African bloodstone, is composed of red jasper, grey chalcedony, and pyrite. Dragon's Blood, sometimes called Australian bloodstone, is composed of red jasper and green epidote.

The name heliotrope derives from ancient beliefs about the manner in which the mineral reflects light. Such notions are described, for example, by Pliny the Elder (Nat. Hist. 37.165).

In the Tropical zodiac, heliotrope is the birthstone for the Astrological sign of Aries.

== Legends and superstitions ==
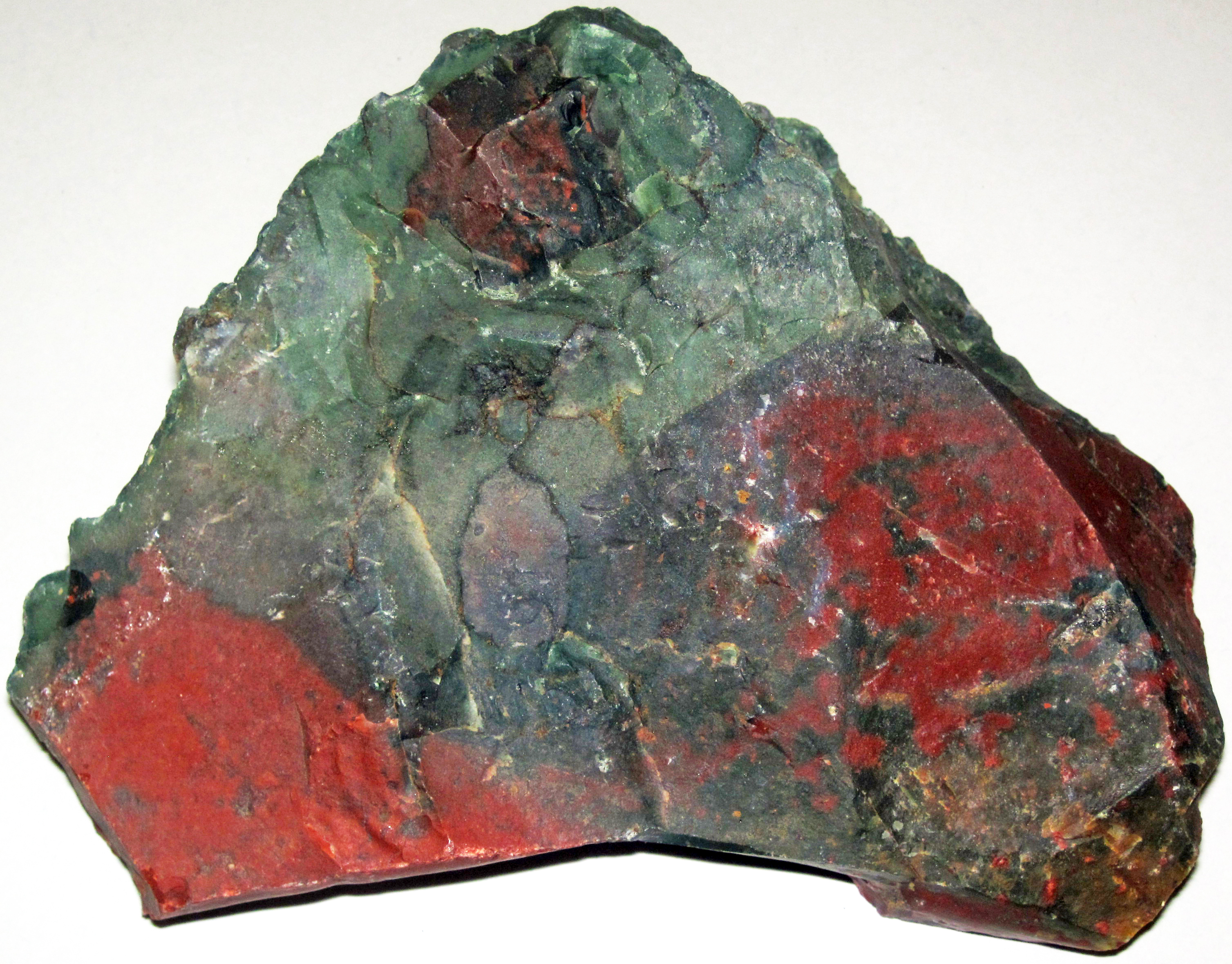
A rough specimen of bloodstone

Heliotrope was called "stone of Babylon" by Albertus Magnus and he referred to several magical properties, which were attributed to it from Late Antiquity. Pliny the Elder (1st century) mentioned first that magicians used it as a stone of invisibility. Damigeron (4th century) wrote about its property to make rain, solar eclipse, and its special virtue in divination and preserving health and youth. A Christian tradition states that the red spots come from blood falling upon the stone during the crucifixion of Jesus, as he was stabbed in the side by a Roman soldier. Ancient Roman soldiers believed that the stone had the ability to slow bleeding and wore it for this reason. In India, it is held that one can staunch the bleeding by placing upon wounds and injuries after dipping them in cold water, which may have a scientific basis in the fact that iron oxide, contained in the stone, is an effective astringent. The Gnostics wore the stone as an amulet for longevity, for wealth and courage, to strengthen the stomach, and to dispel melancholy. In the Middle Ages it was considered useful for animal husbandry. The ancient Greeks and Romans wore the stone to bring renown and favor, to bring endurance, and as a charm against the bite of venomous creatures. Greek and Roman athletes favored it as talisman for success in their games. In Scotland, the Gaels saw heliotropes as the product of an everlasting battle (seen as the aurora borealis) fought by 'the Nimble Ones,' giant faerie-folk who danced and fought in the night skies, their blood pooling into the red part of the aurora before falling in drops to the ground to form bloodstones.

== Sources ==
True Indian bloodstone is primarily found in the Deccan Traps of India, though other rocks with red jasper in them may be found in South Africa, Western Australia, Brazil, Bulgaria, Czech Republic, Italy, Nova Scotia, and numerous locations in the United States. There are also occurrences of bloodstone on the Isle of Rum, in Scotland.
