= Peridot =

Green gem-quality mineral

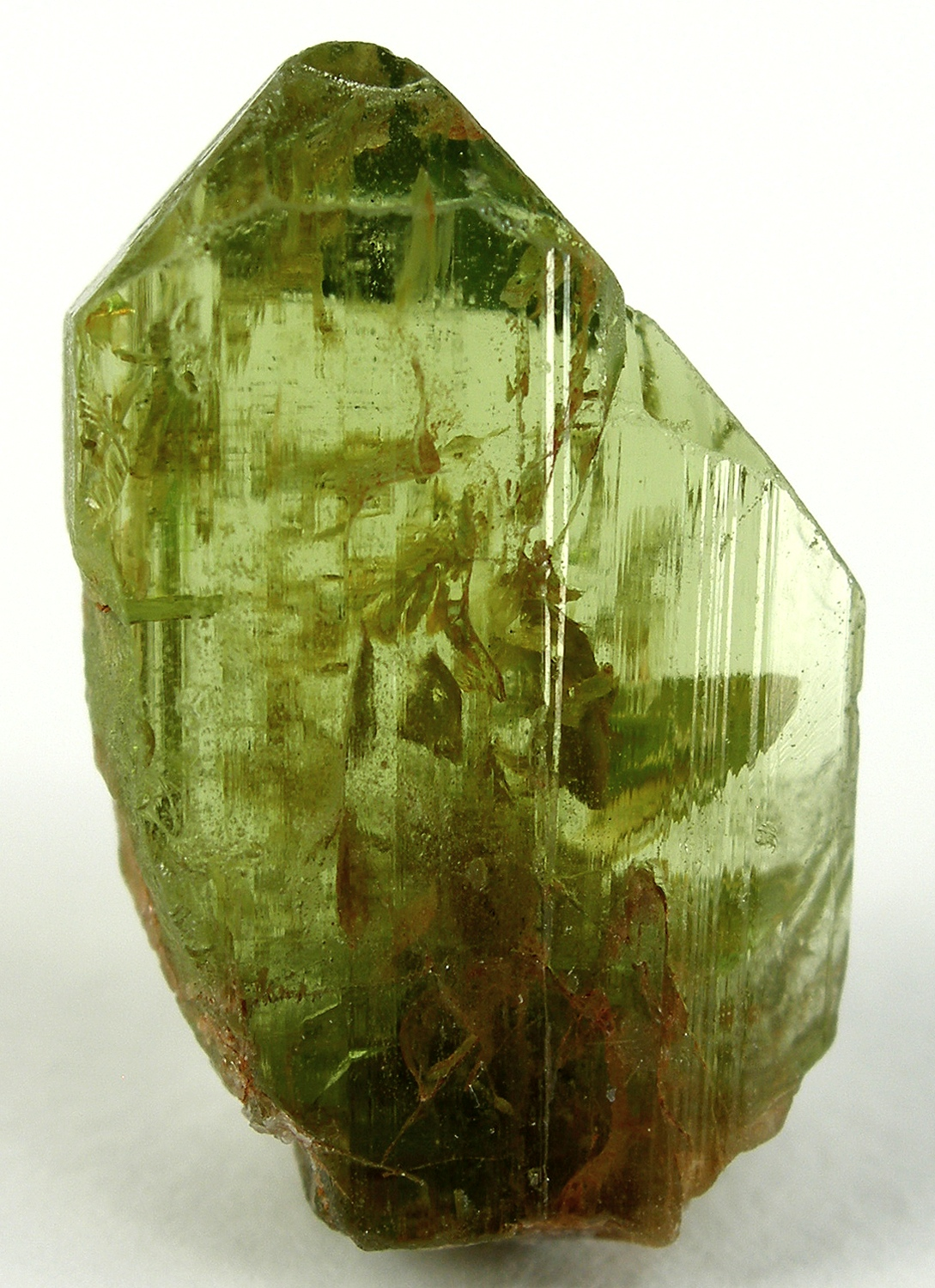

General
- Category: Silicate minerals
- Formula: (Mg,Fe)_{2}SiO_{4}
- Crystal system: Orthorhombic

Identification
- Color: Yellow, to yellow-green, olive-green, to brownish, sometimes a lime green, to emerald hue
- Twinning: Uncommon, simple twinning can occur on {100}, {011},{012}, cyclic twinning on {031}
- Cleavage: Poor on {010} and {110}, {010} cleavage improves with increasing iron content
- Fracture: Conchoidal
- Mohs scale hardness: 6.5–7
- Luster: Vitreous to oily
- Streak: Colorless
- Diaphaneity: Translucent to transparent
- Specific gravity: 3.2–4.3
- Refractive index: 1.64–1.70
- Birefringence: +0.036
- Pleochroism: Weak pale yellow-green to yellow, yellow to yellow orange
- Melting point: between 1,200 and 1,900°C
- Fusibility: Infusible avoid thermal shock
- Solubility: Slowly forms gelatinous silica in H Cl

Peridot (/ˈpɛrɪˌdɒt/ PERR-ih-dot), sometimes called chrysolite, is a yellow-green transparent variety of olivine, specifically the magnesium rich end member called forsterite. Peridot is one of the few gemstones that occur in only one color.

Peridot can be found in mafic and ultramafic rocks occurring in lava and peridotite xenoliths of the mantle. The gem occurs in silica-deficient rocks such as volcanic basalt and pallasitic meteorites. Along with diamonds, peridot is one of only two gems observed to be formed not in Earth's crust, but in the molten rock of the upper mantle. Gem-quality peridot is rare on Earth's surface due to its susceptibility to alteration during its movement from deep within the mantle and weathering at the surface. Peridot has a chemical formula of (Mg,Fe)_{2}SiO_{4}.

Peridot is one of the birthstones for the month of August.

== Etymology ==
The origin of the name peridot is uncertain. The Oxford English Dictionary suggests an alteration of Anglo–Norman pedoretés (classical Latin pæderot-), a kind of opal, rather than the Arabic word faridat, meaning "gemstone".

The Middle English Dictionary's entry on peridot includes several variations: peridod, peritot, pelidod and pilidod — other variants substitute y for letter i used here.

The earliest use of the word in English is possibly in the 1705 register of the St. Albans Abbey: The dual entry is in Latin with the translation to English listed as peridot. It records that on his death in 1245, Bishop John bequeathed various items, including peridot gems, to the Abbey.

== Appearance ==
Peridot is one of the few gemstones that occur in only one color: an olive-green. The intensity and tint of the green, however, depends on the percentage of iron in the crystal structure, so the color of individual peridot gems can vary from yellow, to olive, to brownish-green. In rare cases, peridot may have a medium-dark toned, pure green with no secondary yellow hue or brown mask. Lighter-colored gems are due to lower iron concentrations.

== Mineral properties ==
=== Crystal structure ===
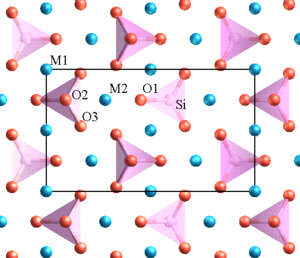
The atomic scale structure of olivine looking along the a axis. Oxygen is shown in red, silicon in pink, and magnesium/iron in blue. A projection of the unit cell is shown by the black rectangle.

The molecular structure of peridot consists of isomorphic olivine, silicate, magnesium and iron in an orthorhombic crystal system. In an alternative view, the atomic structure can be described as a hexagonal, close-packed array of oxygen ions with half of the octahedral sites occupied by magnesium or iron ions and one-eighth of the tetrahedral sites occupied by silicon ions.

=== Surface property ===
Oxidation of peridot does not occur at natural surface temperature and pressure but begins to occur slowly at 600 °C (870 K) with rates increasing with temperature. The oxidation of the olivine occurs by an initial breakdown of the fayalite component, and subsequent reaction with the forsterite component, to give magnetite and orthopyroxene.

== Occurrence ==
=== Geologically ===
Olivine, of which peridot is a type, is a common mineral in mafic and ultramafic rocks, often found in lava and in peridotite xenoliths of the mantle, which lava carries to the surface; however, gem-quality peridot occurs in only a fraction of these settings. Peridots can also be found in meteorites.

Peridots can be differentiated by size and composition. A peridot formed as a result of volcanic activity tends to contain higher concentrations of lithium, nickel and zinc than those found in meteorites.

Olivine is an abundant mineral, but gem-quality peridot is rather rare due to its chemical instability on Earth's surface. Olivine is usually found as small grains and tends to exist in a heavily weathered state, unsuitable for decorative use. Large crystals of forsterite, the variety most often used to cut peridot gems, are rare; as a result, peridot is considered to be precious.

In the ancient world, peridot (then called topazios) was mined on St. John's Island, in the Red Sea, beginning around 300 BCE.

The principal source of peridot olivine today is the San Carlos Apache Indian Reservation in Arizona, US. (Note: "Although some good olive-colored crystals are found in a few other places, like Burma, China, Zambia, and Pakistan, ninety percent of all known peridots are found in just one place. It is a Native American reservation, and it is located in a little-visited corner of the United States: San Carlos." — V. Finlay) It is also mined at another location in Arizona, and in Arkansas, Hawaii, Nevada, and New Mexico at Kilbourne Hole, in the US; and in Australia, Brazil, China, Egypt, Kenya, Mexico, Myanmar (Burma), Norway, Pakistan, Saudi Arabia, South Africa, Sri Lanka, and Tanzania.

=== In meteorites ===
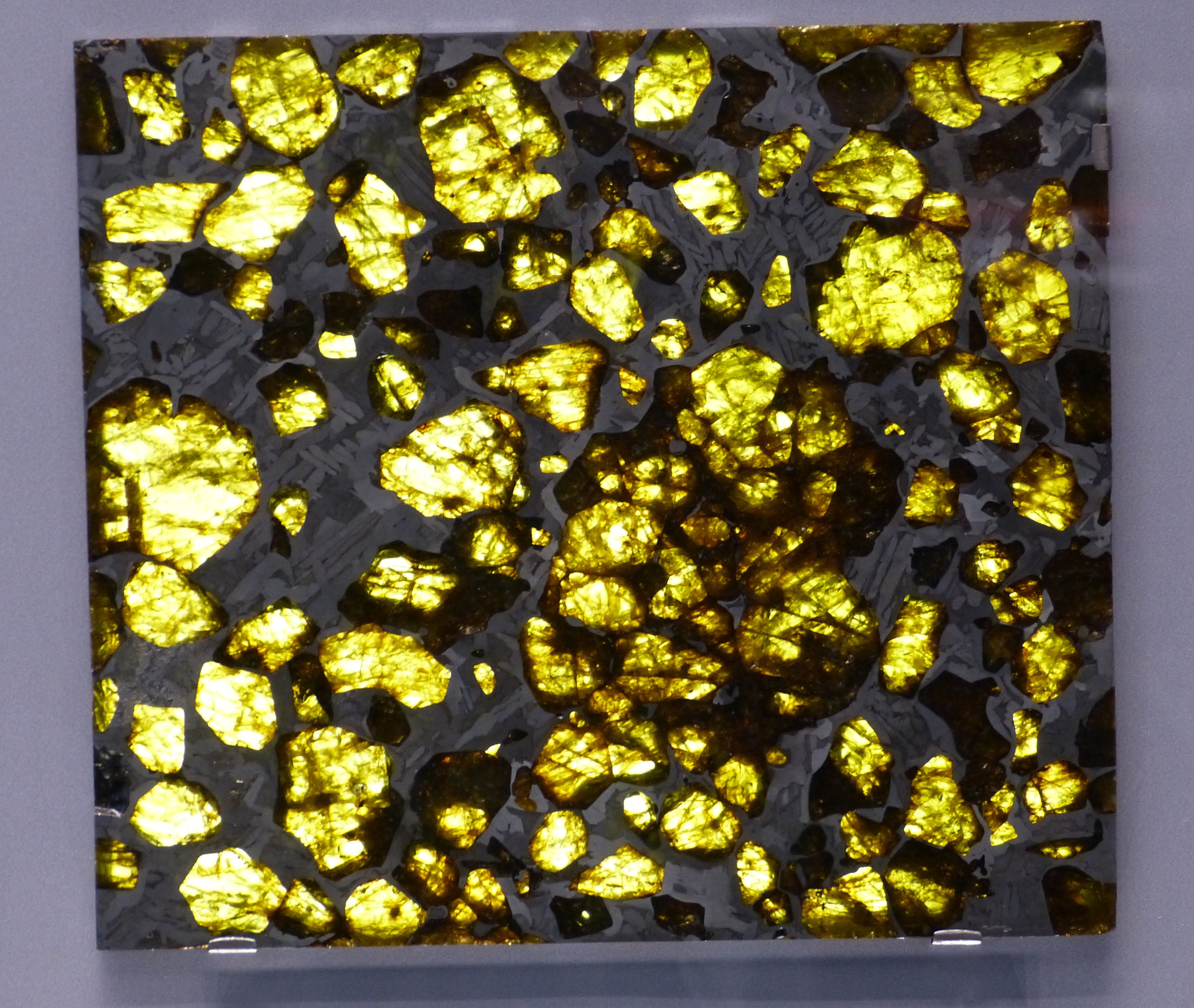
Pallasite meteorite with olive-green peridot crystals, found in Fukang, China.

Peridot crystals have been collected from some pallasite meteorites. The most commonly studied pallasitic peridot belongs to the Indonesian Jeppara meteorite, but others exist such as the Brenham, Esquel, Fukang, and Imilac meteorites. Pallasitic (extraterrestrial) peridot differs chemically from its earthbound counterpart, in that pallasitic peridot lacks nickel.

== Gemology ==
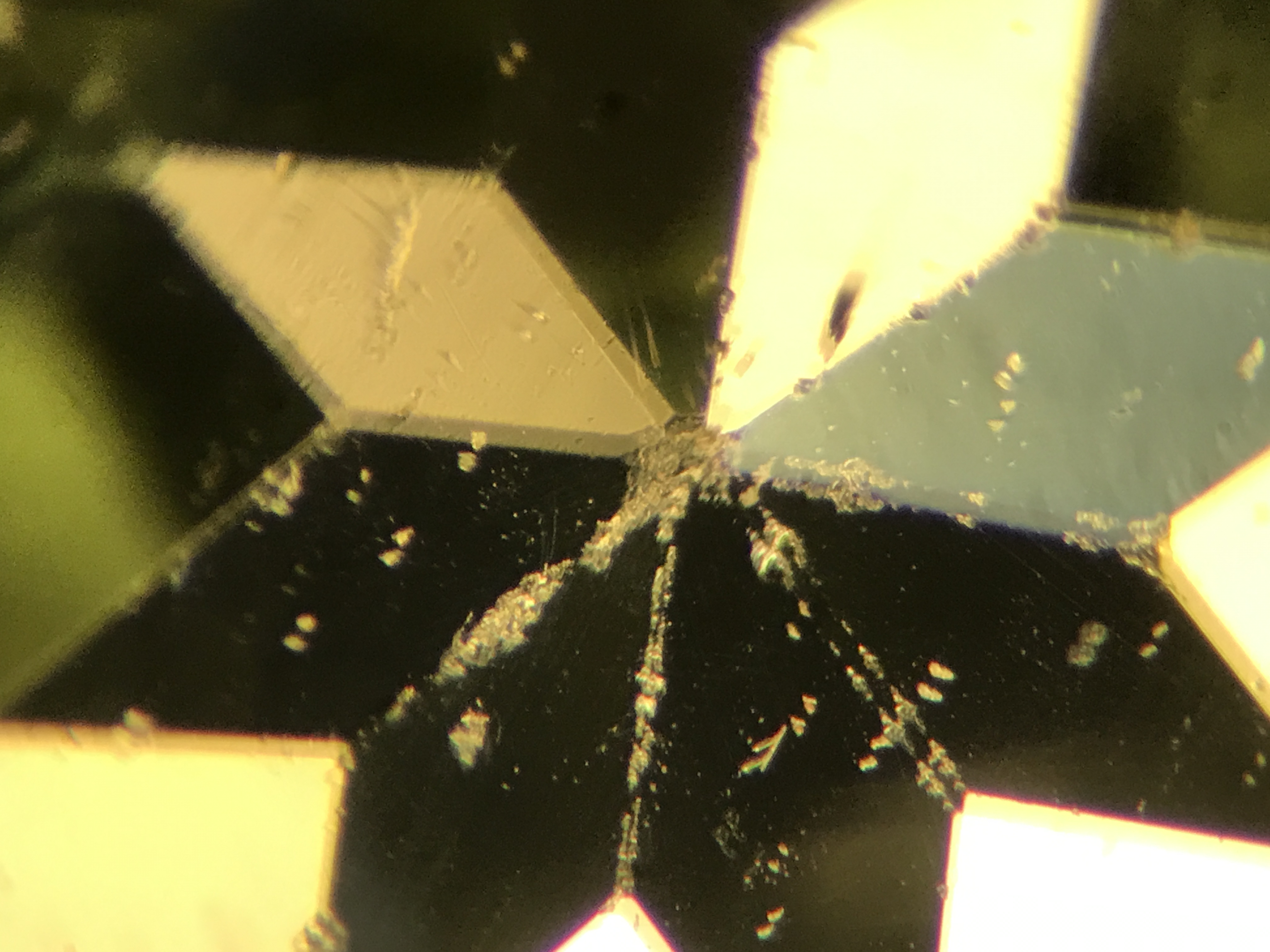
Due to its high birefringence, doubling of facet junctions is commonly seen when viewing peridot under magnification.

Orthorhombic minerals, like peridot, have biaxial birefringence defined by three principal axes: α, β, and γ. Refractive index readings of faceted gems can range around α = 1.651, β = 1.668, and γ = 1.689, with a biaxial positive birefringence of 0.037–0.038. With decreasing magnesium and increasing iron concentration, the specific gravity, color darkness and refractive indices increase, and the β index shifts toward the γ index. Increasing iron concentration ultimately forms the iron-rich end-member of the olivine solid solution series fayalite.

A study of Chinese peridot gem samples determined the hydro-static specific gravity to be 3.36 . The visible-light spectroscopy of the same Chinese peridot samples showed light bands between 493.0 and 481.0 nm, the strongest absorption at 492.0 nm.

The largest cut peridot olivine is a 310-carat (62-gram) specimen in the gem collection of the Smithsonian Museum in Washington, D.C.

Inclusions are common in peridot crystals but their presence depends on the location where it was found and the geological conditions that led to its crystallization.

- Primary negative crystals – rounded gas bubbles – form in situ with peridot, and are common in Hawaiian peridots.
- Secondary negative crystals form in peridot fractures.
- "Lily pad" cleavages are often seen in San Carlos peridots, and are a type of secondary negative crystal. They can easily be seen under reflected light as circular discs surrounding a negative crystal.
- Silky and rod-like inclusions are common in Pakistani peridots.
- The most common mineral inclusion in peridot is the chromium-rich mineral chromite.
- Magnesium-rich minerals also can exist in the form of pyrope and magnesiochromite. These two types of mineral inclusions are typically surrounded by "lily-pad" cleavages.
- Biotite flakes appear flat, brown, translucent, and tabular.

== Cultural history ==
Peridot has been prized since the earliest civilizations for its claimed protective powers to drive away fears and nightmares, according to superstitions. There is a superstition that it carries the gift of "inner radiance", sharpening the mind and opening it to new levels of awareness and growth, helping one to recognize and realize one's destiny and spiritual purpose.

Peridot olivine is the birthstone for the month of August.

Peridot has often been mistaken for emerald, beryl, and other green gems. Noted gemologist G.F. Kunz discussed the confusion between beryl and peridot in many church treasures, most notably the "Three Magi treasure" in the Dom of Cologne, Germany.

== Gallery ==
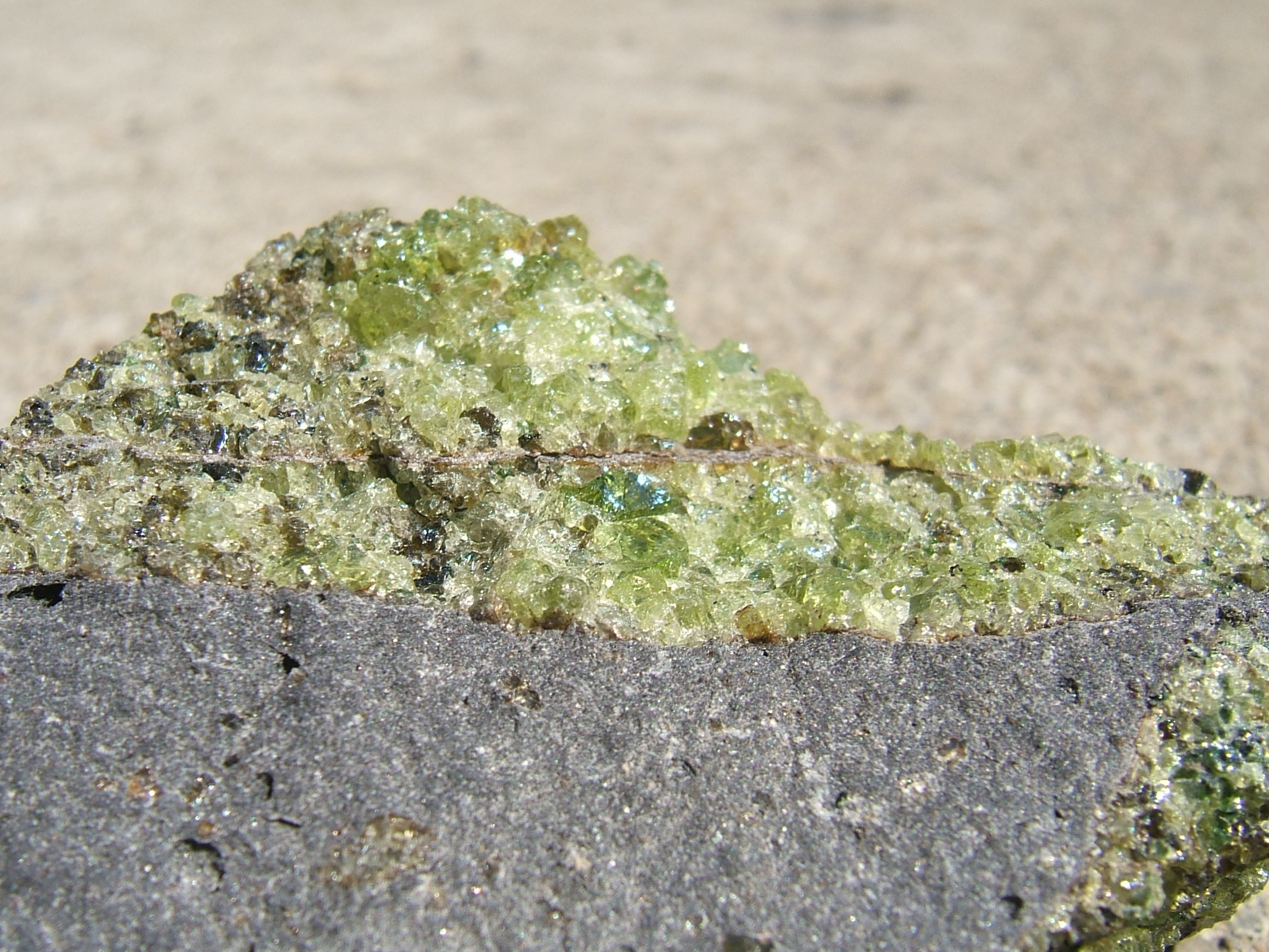
Peridot olivine with minor pyroxene, on vesicular basalt. (field of view = 35 mm)

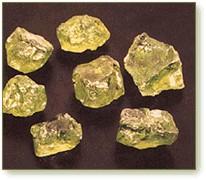
Peridot from the San Carlos Apache Reservation in Arizona.

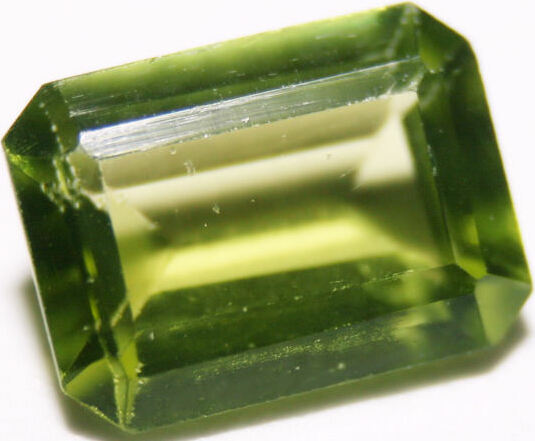
Olive green peridot

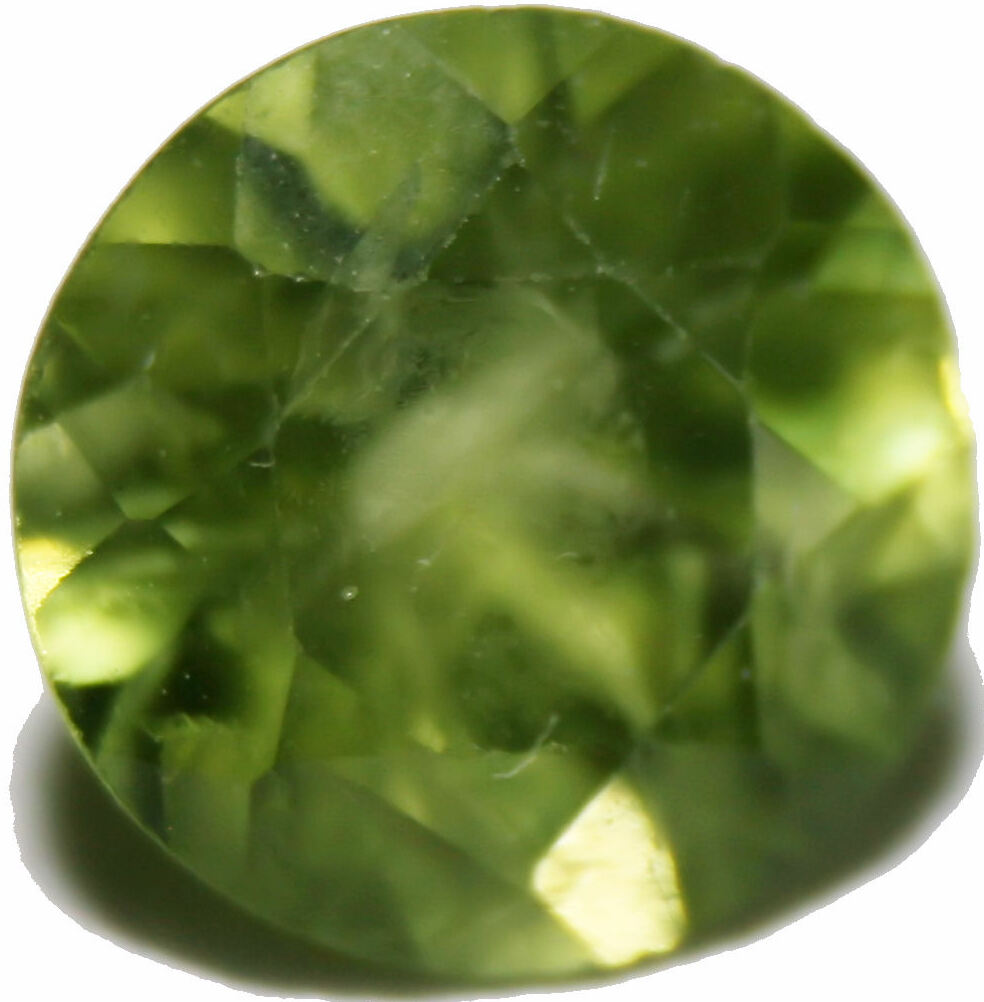
Peridot with milky inclusions
