= Chrysolite =

Chrysolite may refer to:

- Peridot, a gem-quality olivine
- Archaically, any of several green or yellow-green-coloured gemstones including
  - Topaz, a silicate mineral of aluminium and fluorine
  - Chrysoberyl, an aluminate of beryllium
  - Zircon, a mineral belonging to the group of nesosilicates
  - Prehnite, an inosilicate of calcium and aluminium
  - Tourmaline, a crystalline boron silicate mineral compounded with other elements
  - Apatite, a group of phosphate minerals
  - Demantoid, green gemstone variety of the mineral andradite

== See also ==
- List of gemstones in the Bible § Chrysolite
