= Liber Ignium =

Medieval book of recipes for explosives

The Liber Ignium ad Comburendos Hostes (translated as On the Use of Fire to Conflagrate the Enemy, or Book of Fires for the Burning of Enemies, and abbreviated as Book of Fires) is a medieval collection of recipes for incendiary weapons, including Greek fire and gunpowder, written in Latin and allegedly written by a certain Marcus Graecus ("Mark the Greek")—a person whose existence is debated by scholars. The work has been subjected to numerous academic analyses, resulting in contradictory conclusions vis-a-vis origin and influence on its contemporaries.

One of the most influential studies of the Liber Ignium was conducted by Marcellin Berthelot which is cited in 20th century works on the topic.

== Contents ==
The Liber Ignium is a collection of 35 recipes without any internal classification, as it was typical of "secret recipe" list of the era. Of these, 14 are related to warfare, 11 with lamps and lights, 6 with the prevention and treatment of burns, and 4 with the preparation of chemicals, chiefly saltpetre. Some recipes were found to be worthless.

Recipe no. 14 contains advice for the harvesting and processing of saltpeter. In Berthelot's interpretation, it says: "saltpeter is a mineral of the earth, and is found as an efflorescence on stones. This earth is dissolved in boiling water, then purified and passed through a filter. It is boiled for a day and a night and solidified, so that transparent plates of the salt are found at the bottom of the vessel." Furthermore, there are four recipes (nos. 12, 13, 32, and 33) that describe mixtures resembling gunpowder.

== Origins and influence on contemporaries ==
The premillennial Byzantine Greek origin of the text has been rejected by scholars, who date it to the late 13th century. Study of the text has suggested that it was originally translated from Arabic, possibly by a person from Moorish Spain. Joseph Needham says that the text is probably translated from Arabic by Jewish scholars in Spain. It contains several Arabic and Spanish words that are untranslated while several of the recipes for "automatic fire" and "oil of bricks" are identical to Arabic ones from the 12th century.

The influence the Liber Ignium had on Roger Bacon and Albertus Magnus has been debated. Early scholars like the 18th-century scientist Johann Beckmann thought that both men had read and quoted it, but others have claimed that all three were based on a common source. Iqtidar Alam Khan writes that while the Liber Ignium contents can be traced back to Arabic and Chinese texts, the work of Bacon appears to represent a parallel tradition, especially because the decoded formulas of Bacon contain considerably less nitrate.

== Bibliography ==
- Needham, Joseph (1986), Science & Civilisation in China, Volume 5 Part 7: The Gunpowder Epic, Cambridge University Press, ISBN 978-0-521-30358-3
