= Lynxes in mythology =

Examples of the animal in mythology

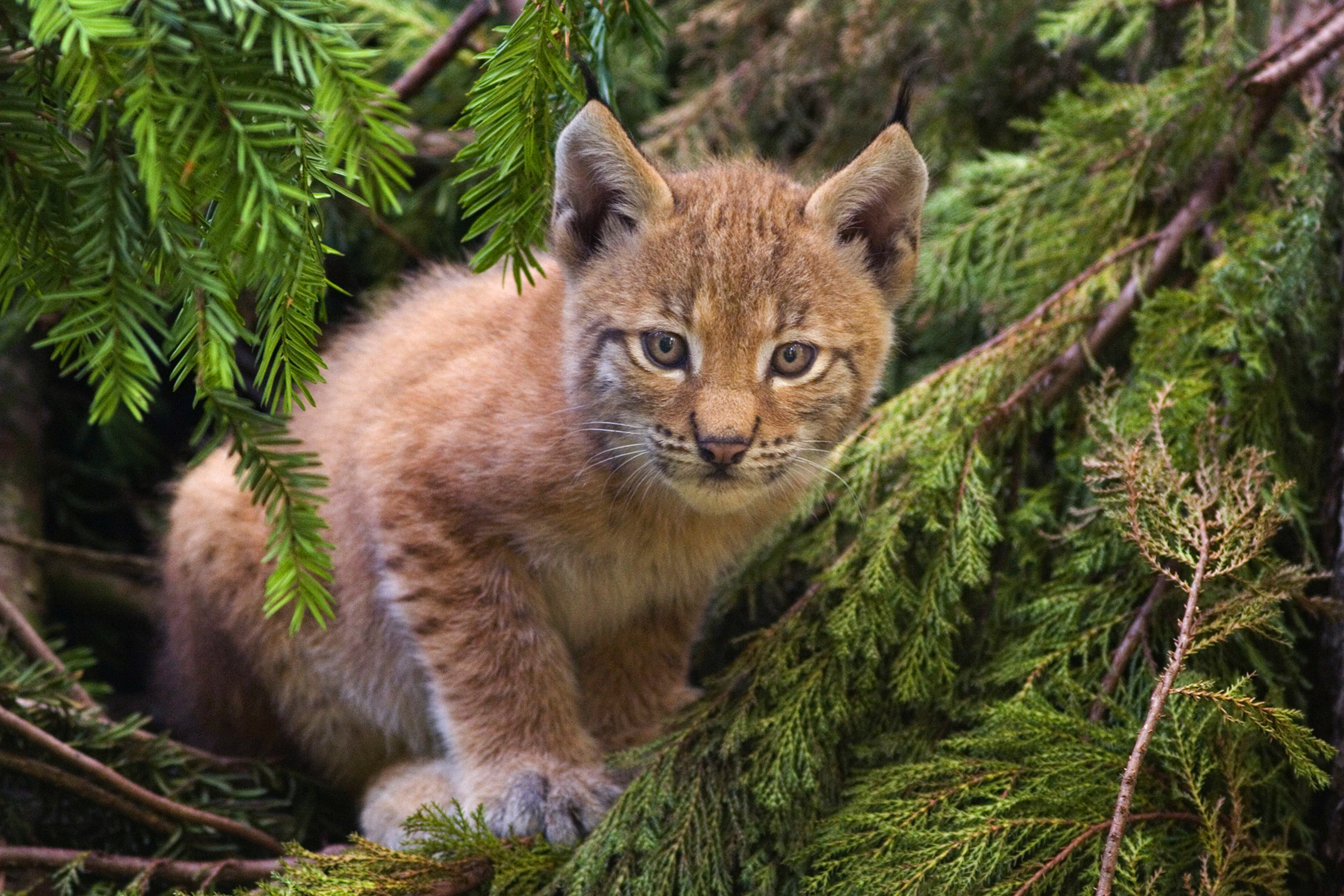
Lynx kitten

The lynx, a genus of wildcat, has a prominent role in Greek, Norse, and North American mythology. The Lynx is scientifically classified as a genus comprising four species across Europe, North Asia, and North American. In mythological traditions, it is considered an elusive and mysterious creature, known in some Native American traditions as a 'keeper of secrets'. It is also believed to have supernatural eyesight, capable of seeing even through solid objects. As a result, it often symbolizes the unravelling of hidden truths, and the psychic power of clairvoyance.

== Lynx stone ==
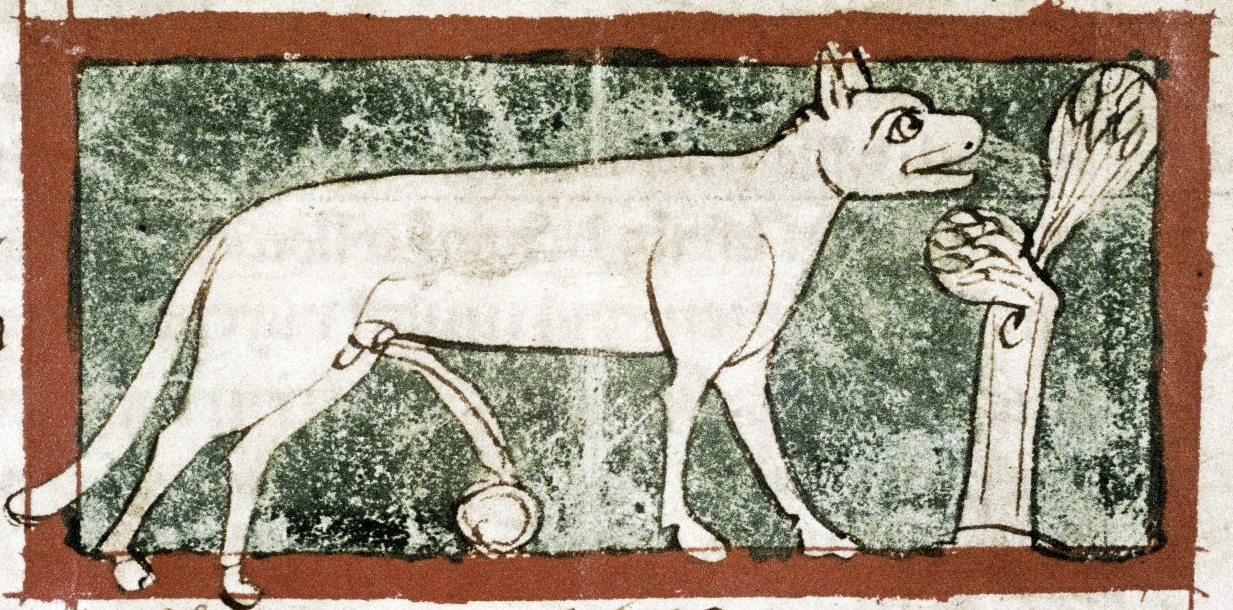
A late 13th-century English bestiary showing the lynx's urine transforming into stone

It is claimed by Theophrastus (c. 371 – c. 287 BC) that the lynx's urine hardens into a precious stone with attractive properties akin to amber. Known as lapis lyncurius or lyngurium, the mythical lynx stone was later mentioned by Pliny the Elder and Ovid; the story was related in almost every medieval lapidary, and bestiary until it gradually disappeared from view in the 17th century. It was believed that the Latin name for amber, 'Lyncurium', was derived from this superstition. Other medieval scholars pointed out that this amber was mined extensively in Liguria, which may hint at a more plausible etymology.

== Transformation of Lyncus ==
In Ovid's Metamorphoses the goddess Ceres commands Triptolemus to travel the world teaching the art of agriculture. He arrives at the court of King Lyncus, who grows desirous of the goddess's favour, and plots to kill Triptolemus in his sleep. No sooner does he raise his sword, however, than he is transformed into a lynx.

== Accademia dei Lincei ==
In 1603, the Accademia dei Lincei ("Academy of Lynxes") was founded by Federico Cesi. It was one of the world's oldest scientific societies; one of its members was Galileo Galilei. The academy's founders were inspired by the illustration of a lynx on the cover of Magia Naturalis, and the words in the preface: "...with lynx-like eyes, examining those things which manifest themselves, so that having observed them, he may zealously use them." Their emblem was a lynx battling with Cerberus, the guardian of the underworld, invoking the lynx's reputation for seeing through falsehood and discovering the truth.

== Constellation ==
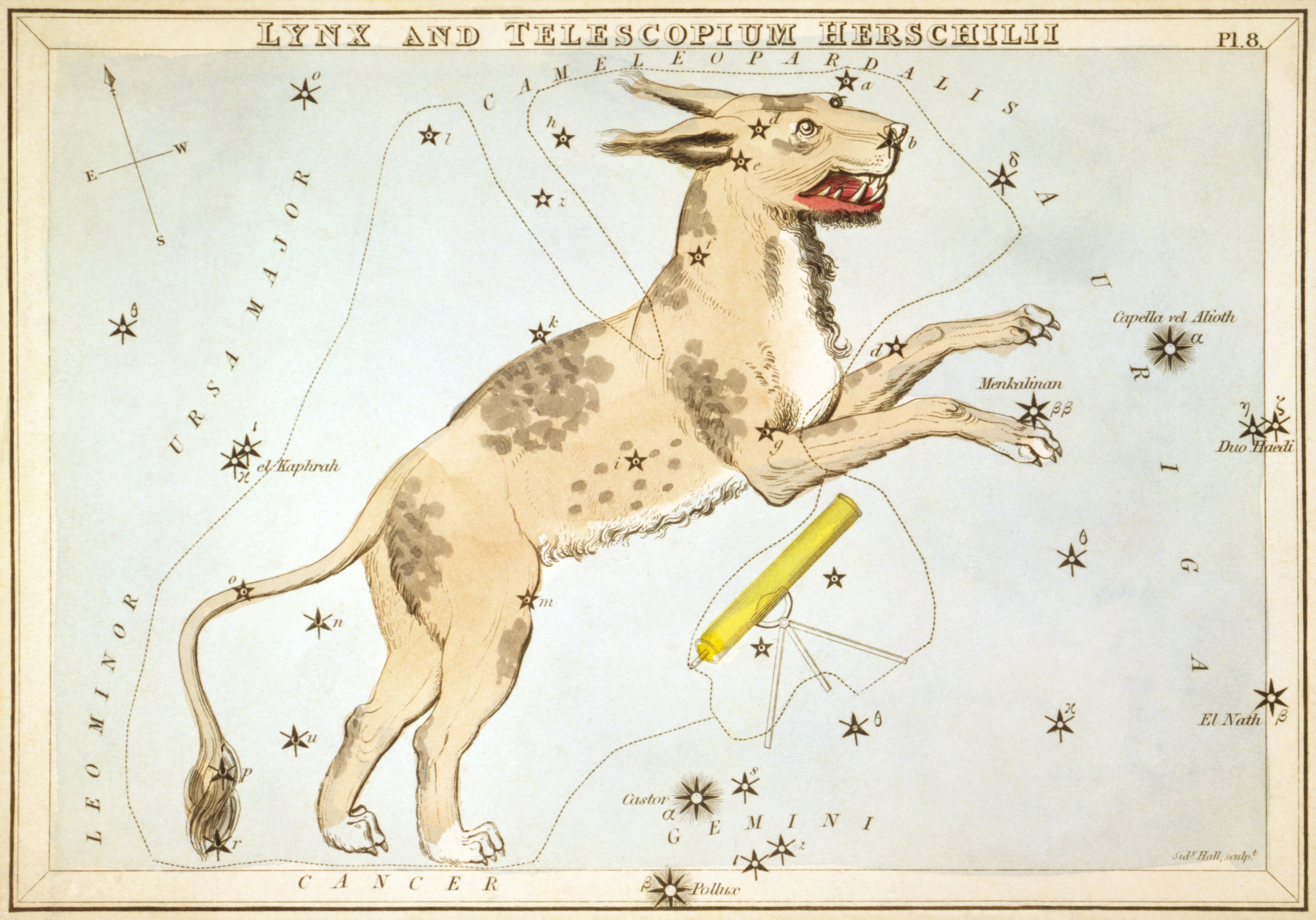
Illustration from Urania's Mirror (1825)

Lynx is the name of a constellation in the northern sky, defined by Johannes Hevelius in 1687. The name is said to have been chosen because the stars which make up the constellation are so faint that only those with the eyesight of the lynx can perceive them.

Laurens van der Post describes the connection between the stars and the lynx in the Bushman culture of Africa: "In the imagination of the vanished Bushmen of my part of Africa the Morning Star was a hunter too, but it was also a person of the early race. As a person he had come down to earth, fallen in love and taken as his natural bride the Lynx, also at that time a person. This marriage of a star to a Lynx is perhaps the most inspiring example I know of the extraordinary precision of language which the first spirit forged in the fire of the imagination. If there is one animal among the multitudes shining like jewels in the grass, bush and somber forests of Africa more suitable than any other to be married to a star, it is the Lynx."
