= Lapidary (disambiguation) =

Lapidary is the practice of shaping stone, minerals, or gemstones.

Lapidary may also refer to:

- Lapidary (text) a treatise on gemology, especially when pre-modern
  - Old English Lapidary
- Lapidary Point, a headland on King George Island
- Lapidary style, a style of prose appropriate for memorials, mausoleums, stelae

== See also ==
- Lapidarium (disambiguation)
