= Priestly breastplate =

Jewish ritual object worn by the High Priest

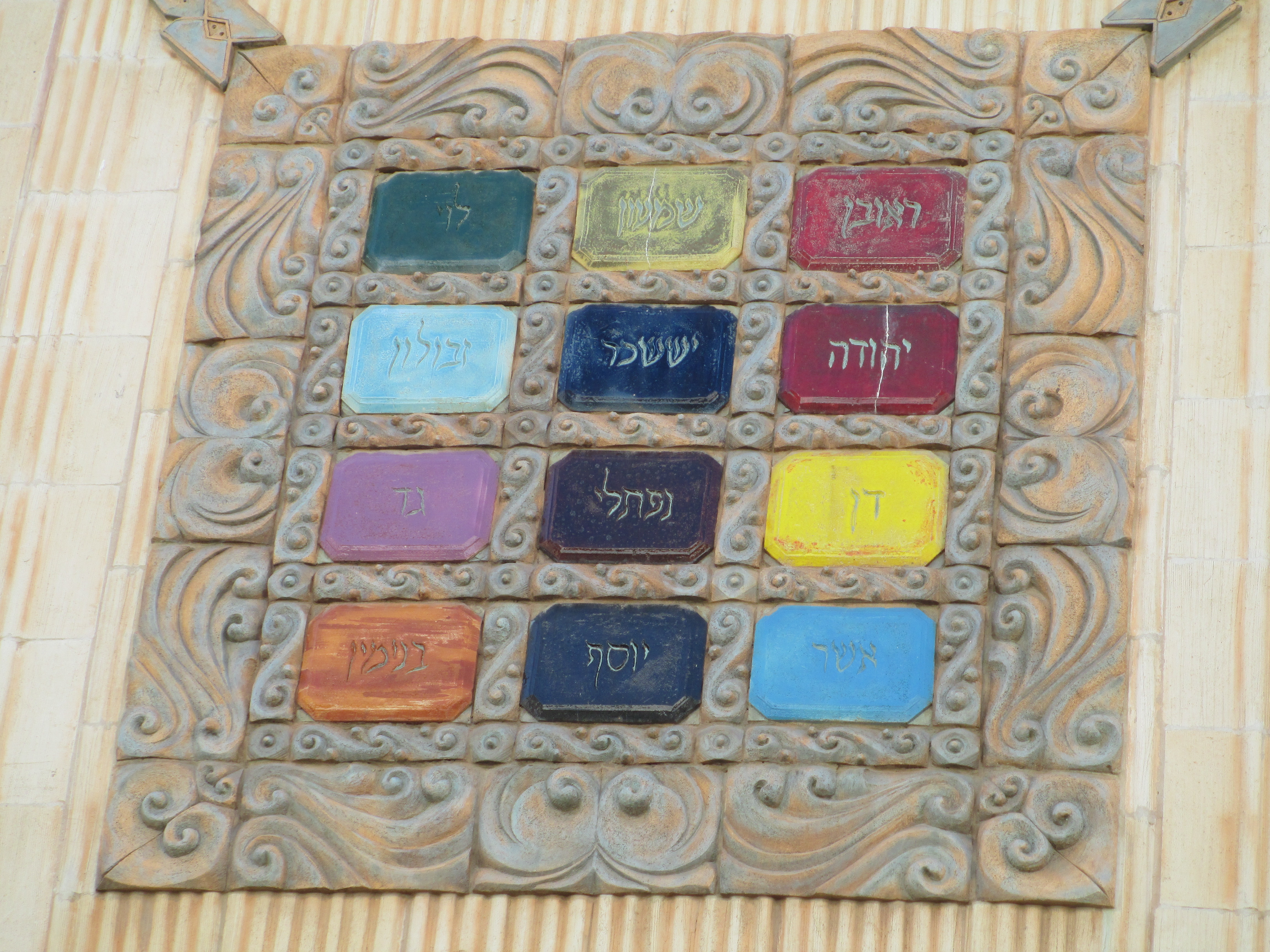
Ceramic replica of the High Priest's breastplate

The priestly breastplate or breastpiece of judgement (Hebrew: חֹשֶׁן ḥōšen) was a sacred breastplate worn by the High Priest of the Israelites, according to the Book of Exodus. In the biblical account, the breastplate is termed the breastplate of judgment (Hebrew: חֹשֶׁן מִשְׁפָּט ḥōšen mišpāṭ – Exodus 28:15), because the Urim and Thummim (Hebrew: הָאוּרִים וְהַתֻּמִּים hāʾūrīm wəhattummīm) were placed upon it (Exodus 28:30). These elements of the breastplate are said in the Exodus verse to carry the judgment (Hebrew: מִשְׁפָּט mišpāṭ) of God concerning the Israelites at all times.

== Hebrew Bible ==
According to the description in Exodus, this breastplate was attached to the tunic-like garment known as an ephod by gold chains or cords tied to the gold rings on the ephod's shoulder straps and by blue ribbon tied to the gold rings at the belt of the ephod. The biblical description states that the breastplate was also to be made from the same material as the ephod—embroidery of three colors of dyed linen—and was to be one third of a cubit squared, two layers thick, and with four rows of three engraved gems embedded in gold settings upon it, one setting for each stone. The description states that the square breastplate was to be formed from one rectangular piece of cloth—one third of a cubit by two thirds of a cubit, folded so that it formed a pouch to contain the Urim and Thummim.

The Hebrew term for the breastplate, חֹשֶׁן (ḥōšen), appears to be named from its appearance; The 19th-century German biblical scholar August Dillmann thought that it was likely to be derived from the Hebrew word חֹצֶן (ḥōṣen), meaning "fold", relating to its function.

According to the Talmud, the wearing of the Hoshen atoned for the sin of errors in judgment on the part of the Children of Israel.

== The jewels ==
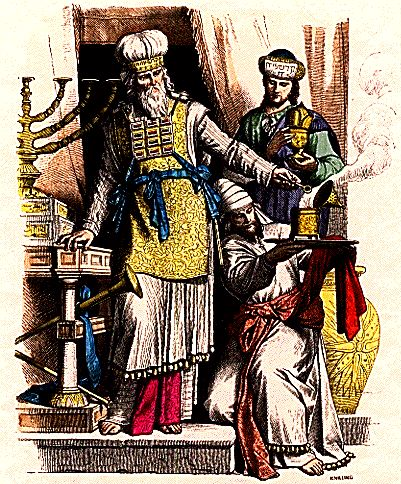
Artist's conception of Jewish high priest wearing a hoshen in ancient Judah

According to the Biblical description, the twelve jewels in the breastplate were each to be made from specific minerals, none identical to another, and each of them representative of a specific tribe, whose name was to be inscribed on the stone.

According to a rabbinic tradition, the names of the twelve tribes were engraved upon the stones with what is called שָׁמִיר shamir in Hebrew, which Jewish legend explains to be a small, rare creature which could cut through the toughest surfaces. According to most authorities such as Rabbi David Kimhi and Rabbi Jonah ibn Janah, shamir was a stone stronger than iron, probably emery which finds its equivalent in the Greek, σμήρις (smeris).

There are different views in classical rabbinical literature as to the order of the names; the Jerusalem Targum, for example, argued that the names appeared in the order according to which they were born. Maimonides describes the jewel stones arranged in four rows, saying that on the first stone belonging to Reuben were also engraved the names of Abraham, Isaac, and Jacob, while on the last stone belonging to Benjamin were also engraved the words "the tribes of God"; kabbalistic writers such as Hezekiah ben Manoah and Bahya ben Asher argued that only six letters from each name were present on each stone, together with a few letters from the names of Abraham, Isaac, or Jacob, or from the phrase "[these are] the tribes of Jeshurun", so that there were 72 letters in total (72 being a very significant number in Kabbalistic thought).

There was also a different order for the names inscribed on the two "onyx" stones on the High Priest's shoulders. One opinion suggests that the names of the twelve tribes were arranged in groups after their mothers: Leah's six sons aligned one after the other on one stone, with Judah heading this list, followed by Rachel's sons with the names of the concubines' sons interposed between the two sons of Rachel.

Unfortunately, the meanings of the Hebrew names for the minerals, given by the Masoretic Text, are obscure and historically subjected to dispute. Several recent studies have developed a scientific methodology for identifying the jewels of the breastplate. Harrell, Hoffmeier & Williams (2017) compared the Hebrew gemstones with attested gemstones from Ancient Egypt. Ayil (2024) compared the Hebrew names with names of gemstones from across the Ancient Near East, claiming to have identified 11 out of 12 with a high degree of certainty, the exception being 'yahalom'.

Though the Greek names for them in the Septuagint are more apparent, some scholars believe that they cannot be wholly relied on for this matter because the Septuagint's translations are contradictory. Several Greek names for various gems have changed meaning between the classical era and modern times. Classical rabbinical literature argues that the names were inscribed using shamir because neither chisels nor paint nor ink were allowed to mark them out, whereas a more naturalistic approach suggests that the jewels must have had comparatively low hardness to be engraved upon. Therefore, this gives an additional clue as to the identity of the minerals.

Explanations of the symbolic meaning of the jewels generated a great deal of both Jewish and Christian writing and were a staple component of the tradition of lapidaries or books on gemology.

The names and proposed identities of the jewel stones are as follows:

=== First row ===
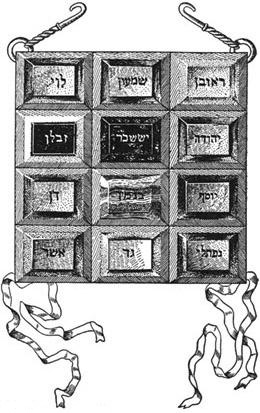
Illustration of priestly breastplate

- Odem (אֹדֶם in the Masoretic Text) / Sardios (in the Septuagint) – derives from the Hebrew root for "red" and probably refers to carnelian or sard, a common gemstone in classical cultures. A parallel semantic development occurred in the Akkadian term sāmtu ("carnelian"), which derived from sāmu (also meaning "red"), suggesting that Odem referred to carnelian. Carnelian was a common gemstone in the surrounding regions of Egypt and Mesopotamia. All authors agree that this stone was red. Some modern translations translate this stone as being a ruby, but rubies were unknown in biblical times.
- Pitdah (פִּטְדָה in the Masoretic Text) / Topazios (in the Septuagint) – despite the implication of some translators that it was topaz, topaz was not known at the time of the Exodus; in the classical era, topazios always refers to peridot. The word pitdah is related to and translated by Greek topazios. Peridot, a light green semi-precious stone, was found carved into two known Middle Kingdom scarabs.
- Bareḳet (בָּרֶקֶת in the Masoretic Text, cf. בָּרְקַת) / Smaragdos (in the Septuagint) – Bareketh etymologically derives from a root meaning "yellow-green", whence its color. Smaragdos is ancestral to the word emerald, but smaragdos could apply to several different green gems, not just the emerald. Emerald in the stricter modern sense of green beryl exists locally in Egypt, but was not actively mined until the Ptolemaic period, therefore emerald was unknown in biblical times. Instead of emerald, the weight of the evidence for bareḳet being green jasper is compelling.

=== Second row ===
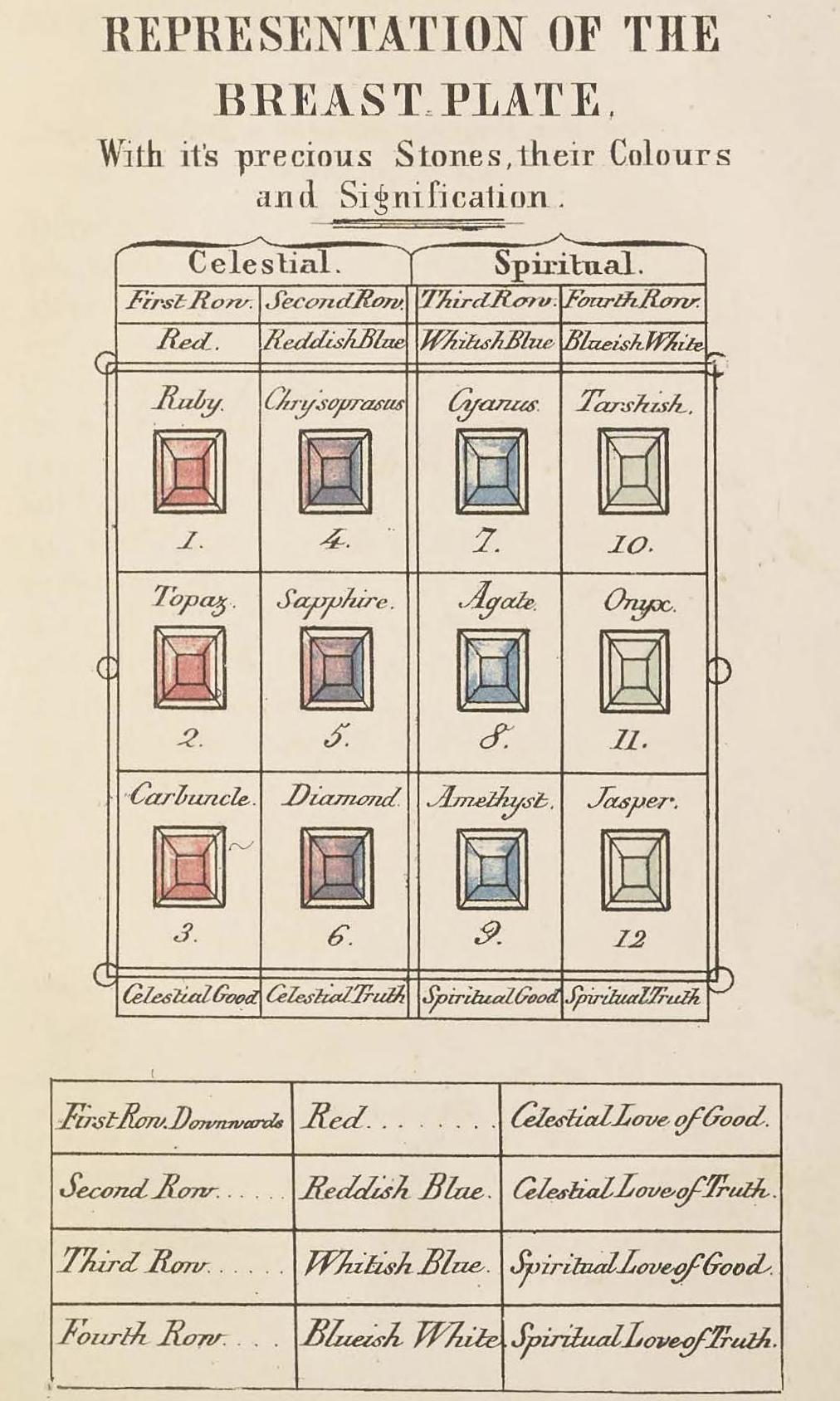
Interpretation of the hoshen by Robert Hindmarsh

- Nofekh (נֹפֶךְ in the Masoretic Text) / Anthrax (in the Septuagint) – Nofekh appears to be a loanword from the Egyptian term mfkꜣt, referring to turquoise, a greenish-blue gemstone. This mineral was most frequently mined in Egypt during the second millennium BCE at the sites of Serabit el-Khadim and Gebel Maghara in the Sinai Peninsula. The Babylonian Targum and first Jerusalem Targum support this identification, favoring it being green.
- Sappir (סַפִּיר in the Masoretic Text) / Sapphiros (in the Septuagint) – despite sounding like sapphire, sapphire was unknown before the era of the Roman Empire. Once sapphire became better known, it was rendered in Greek and Latin by the terms hyacinth or jacinth (no relation to the modern minerals of those names). The term sappir referred to lapis lazuli, a mineral of similar color to sapphires and that the name gradually came to refer to the latter mineral on account of its color. Lapis lazuli is a stone with a deep, ocean-blue color which was frequently sent as a gift to Akhenaten from Babylon. Theophrastus mentions the stone sapphiros as being "dark" and having the "color of verdigris", as well as being "speckled as of with gold". Theophrastus' description of sapphiros fits lapis lazuli.
- Yahalom (יָהֲלֹם in the Masoretic Text) / Iaspis ἴασπις (in the Septuagint) – in some other places the Septuagint instead has Beryllios where the Masoretic reads Yahalom. A few scholars have suggested that Yahalom may refer to diamonds, owing to their hardness, though the ability to cut diamonds had not been discovered before the classical era. The Septuagint employs the word Iaspis, which Pliny the Elder only described as referring to a category of blue-green stones composed of a great number of mineral species. In the Syriac Peshitta of the sixth or seventh century (MS. B.21, Inferiore of the Ambrosian Library in Milan, Italy), the word used to describe this stone is ܢܩܥܬܐ = naq'atha, a word which is sometimes transliterated into Arabic as it is pronounced in Aramaic, mainly by Arabic-speaking Christians. Bar-Ali, a 9th-century Arab author, brings down two opinions about this stone, the naq'atha, saying, by one opinion, that it is "honey-coloured", and by the other opinion that it is "turquoise, a blue-coloured stone". In some versions of the Peshitta, the Aramaic word rendered for the same stone is shabzez. Other scholars have proposed a variety of quartz, especially the common milky quartz (known for its moon-like whiteness). Spanish Jewish scholar Abraham ibn Ezra says the yahalom was a white stone.

=== Third row ===
- Lešem (לֶשֶׁם in the Masoretic Text) / Ligurios (in the Septuagint) – the Hebrew name is clearly derived from Egyptian nšmt, referring to amazonite. This identification is in contrast to the Septuagint, which identifies it as Greek liggourrion or lyngurium. Some scholars have taken to imply that it referred to amber.
- Ševo (שְׁבוֹ in the Masoretic Text) / Achates (in the Septuagint) – ševo derives from the Akkadian term šubû, meaning agate, and achates definitely refers to a banded agate. Archaeological finds indicating widespread circulation of agate through Mesopotamia, Anatolia, Iran, and the Levant. Agate’s banded appearance and varied coloration made it a prized material for ornamentation, amulets, and seals.
- Aḥlamah (אַחְלָמָה in the Masoretic Text) / Amethystos (in the Septuagint) – Aḥlamah is derived from Egyptian ḫnmt referring to red jasper, a mineral widely attested in Egypt. The Septuagint's rendering with amethystos refers to amethyst, a purple mineral which was believed to protect against getting drunk from alcohol (amethyst's name refers to this belief, and literally translates as "not intoxicating"). Both gemstones were known in Egypt. In the Babylonian Targum, aḥlamah is translated into a term meaning strong drinking, which appears to reference beliefs about amethyst, but in the Jerusalem Targum, it is translated into a term meaning calf's eye (probably also a reference to jasper). The Midrash Rabba (Numbers Rabba 2:7), while describing the stone's color, says: "[It is] similar to clear wine whose redness is not too strong."

=== Fourth row ===
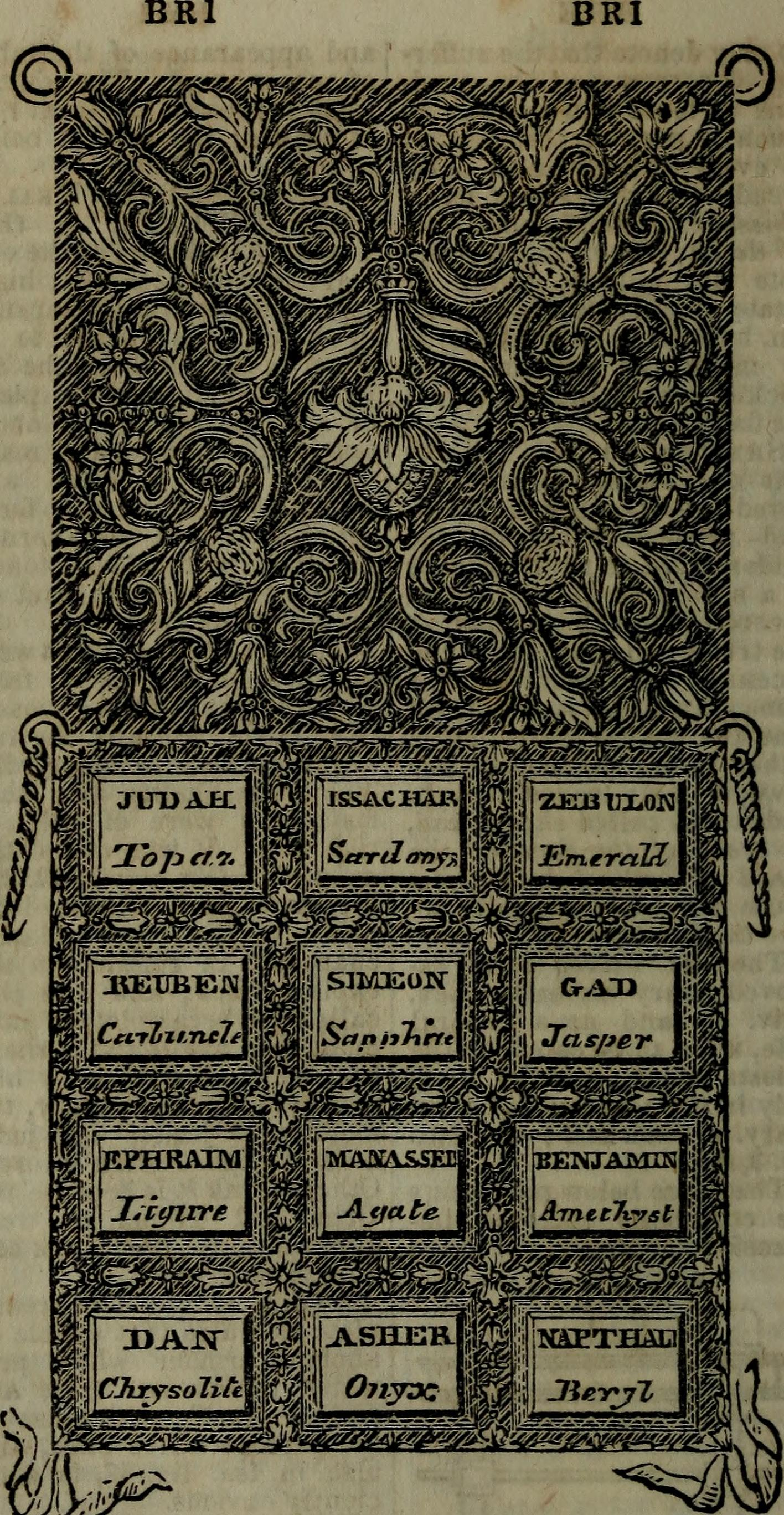
An 1837 illustration depicting breastplate, with the tribes and their jewels

- Taršīš (תַּרְשִׁישׁ in the Masoretic Text) / Chrysolithos (in the Septuagint) – The context of Daniel 10:5–6 suggests that taršīš was a luminous or warm-colored stone, which Ayil identified as referring to Baltic Amber, as it was the only golden-colored stone used by the Israelites. Chrysolithos does not refer to chrysolite, which was named much later, but is an adjective which translates as "gold stone", meaning that it was golden. As a golden material, chrysolithos likely refers to amber, or to peridot since chrysolithos could refer to peridot in the classical era.
- Šoham (שֹׁהַם in the Masoretic Text) / Beryllios (in the Septuagint) – onychion refers to onyx, an opaque and banded stone. "Onyx" is derived from the Greek for fingernail due to the pink-white veining. (Note: The Oxford English Dictionary, Webster's New International Dictionary (Second Edition), and The American Heritage Dictionary of the English Language (College Edition) state that "onyx" derives from the Greek term, "onux", meaning "(finger-)nail", "claw" or onyx-stone. The connection between "nail" or "claw" and the stone is that the onyx stone is usually found with a vein of white on a pink background, like the lunula of a fingernail. There is no indication in these or other desk dictionaries that "onyx" could be derived from a word meaning "ring".) However the onyx most used for jewelry was a black-and-white banded stone with clear distinction between the bands.
- Yošfe (יָשְׁפֶה in the Masoretic Text, cf. יָשְׁפֵה) / Iaspis (in the Septuagint and Josephus). (Note: Josephus twice mentions the stones of the breastplate; once in his Antiquities, and again in his Wars, but he reverses the order in the third and fourth rows.) Although yošfe and iaspis are cognate to jasper, they do not quite have the same meaning; while jasper can be any color, the mineral which the Greeks called iaspis was generally a blue or green one (the most prized form of jasper), and scholars think this is most likely to be the color referred to by yošfe. Since a blue chalcedony has been found bearing an Elamite inscription calling it yašpu, clearly a cognate of both yošfe and Iaspis, the biblical stone has been identified as a blue-grey chalcedony.

=== 12 jewels in the New Testament ===
In the New Testament Book of Revelation is the description of a city wall, with each layer of stones in the wall being from a different material; in the original Koine Greek, the layers are given as iaspis, sapphiros, chalcedon, smaragdos, sardonyx, sardion, chrysolithos, beryllos, topazion, chrysoprason, yacinthos, amethystos. This list appears to be based on the Septuagint's version of the list of jewels in the Breastplate – if the top half of the breastplate was rotated by 180 degrees, and the bottom half turned upside down, with Onchion additionally swapping places with Topazion, the lists become remarkably similar; there are only four differences:

- Onchion (literally onyx) has become sardonyx (red onyx)
- Anthrax has become chalcedon (literally meaning chalcedony, of which the red variety is the most common). Anthrax literally means coal, presumably the red color of burning coal.
- Ligurios has become chrysoprason. Scholars suspect that ligurios was a pale yellowish mineral, and although chrysoprase now refers to a specific gemstone which is generally apple-green in color, in earlier times it referred to gems of a yellowish leek-green, such as peridot; chrysoprase literally means golden leek.
- Achates (agate) has been replaced by yacinthos (jacinth). According to classical rabbinical literature, the specific agate was of a sky-blue color, and though jacinth now refers to a red-tinted clear gem, this was not the case at the time the Book of Revelation was written, and at that time jacinth appears to have referred to a bluish gem; Pliny describes jacinth as a dull and blueish amethyst, while Solinus describes it as a clear blue tinted gem – the modern sapphire.

=== Pattern ===
Whether there is any pattern to the choice of gemstones depends on their identity. Taking the majority view of scholars regarding the identity of the gems, and including the implication from the Book of Revelation that the onyx at the end of the fourth row was a sardonyx, there are four colors – red, green, yellow, and blue – each represented by a clear gem (red – carbuncle, green – heliodor, yellow – chrysolite, blue – amethyst), an opaque gem (red – carnelian/red jasper, green – green jasper, yellow – yellow jasper/yellow serpentine, blue – lapis lazuli), and a striped gem (red – sardonyx, green – malachite, yellow – pale golden agate, blue – sky-blue agate). The four colors of red, green, yellow, and blue are the first four colors (apart from black and white) distinguished by languages and are distinguished in all cultures with at least six color distinctions (the other two being black and white). These colors roughly correspond to the sensitivities of the retinal ganglion cells. (The retinal ganglia process color by positioning it within a blue to yellow range, and separately positioning it within a red to green range.)

== See also ==
- Ephod
- Priestly golden head plate
- Priestly robe (Judaism)
- Priestly sash
- Priestly tunic
- Priestly turban
- Priestly undergarments

=== Other ===
- Birthstone – Gemstone representing a person's birth month
- Gemstones in the Bible
- Lamen (magic) – Magical pendant worn around the neck
- List of inscriptions in biblical archaeology
- Twelve Stones – Stones of the Twelve Tribes of Israel

== Notes ==
=== Bibliography ===
- Ayil, Ephraim S. (2024). Identifying the Stones of Classical Hebrew: A Modern Philological Approach. Ancient Languages and Civilizations. Vol. 7. Leiden/Boston: Brill. ISBN 978-90-04-67799-9.
- Berlin, Brent; Kay, Paul (1969). Basic Color Terms: their Universality and Evolution. University of California Press. ISBN 9780520014428.
- Blake, Robert Pierpont; de Vis, H. (1934). Epiphanius de Gemmis: the Old Georgian Version and the Fragments of the Armenian Version. London: Christophers.
- Cheyne, Thomas Kelly; Black, J. Sutherland (1899). Encyclopaedia Biblica.
- Eichholz, D. E., ed. (1965). Theophrastus: De Lapidibus. Oxford: Clarendon Press.
- Faris, Nabih Amin (1938). The Antiquities of South Arabia: being a translation from the Arabic with linguistic, geographic, and historic notes of the eighth book of al-Hamdāni's al-Iklīl. Oxford University Press.
- Field, Frederick (1875). Origensis Hexaplorum quæ Supersunt. Oxford.
- Gottheil, Richard H., ed. (1908). Bar 'Alī (Īshō'): The Syriac–Arabic Glosses. Rome: Reale Accademia Nazionale dei Lincei.
- Harrell, James E.; Hoffmeier, James K.; Williams, Kenton F. (2017). "Hebrew Gemstones in the Old Testament: A Lexical, Geological, and Archaeological Analysis". Bulletin for Biblical Research. 27 (1): 1–52. doi:10.5325/bullbiblrese.27.1.0001. ISSN 1065-223X. S2CID 246560656.
- Kostov, R. I. (2023). Gem Minerals of the Bible. Multiprint, Sofia, 320 p. (in Bulgarian with English abstract) ISBN 978-954-362-436-2
- Neusner, Jacob; Sonn, Tamara (1999). Comparing Religions through Law: Judaism and Islam.
- Walton, Steven A. (2001). "Theophrastus on Lyngurium: medieval and early modern lore from the classical lapidary tradition". Annals of Science. 58 (4): 357–379. doi:10.1080/000337900110041371. PMID 11724065. S2CID 8649133.
