= Rocky Cove =

Rocky Cove (62°11′41″S 58°55′51″W) is a cove between Lapidary Point and Suffield Point, Maxwell Bay, King George Island. Following surveys by Soviet Antarctic Expedition from 1968, the feature was called "Bukhta Kamenistaya" (rocky bay). The name has been approved in the translated form recommended by the United Kingdom Antarctic Place-Names Committee (UK-APC) in 1978.
