= Lapidarium (disambiguation) =

A lapidarium is a place where stone monuments and fragments of archaeological interest are exhibited.

Lapidiarium may also refer to:

- Lapidarium (Aceves), a sculpture exhibition by Gustavo Aceves
- Lapidarium, Kerch, a museum in Crimea
- Lapidarium, Prague, a museum in the Czech Republic

== See also ==
- Lapidary (disambiguation)
