= Lyngurium =

Mythical gemstone believed to be formed of the solidified urine of the lynx

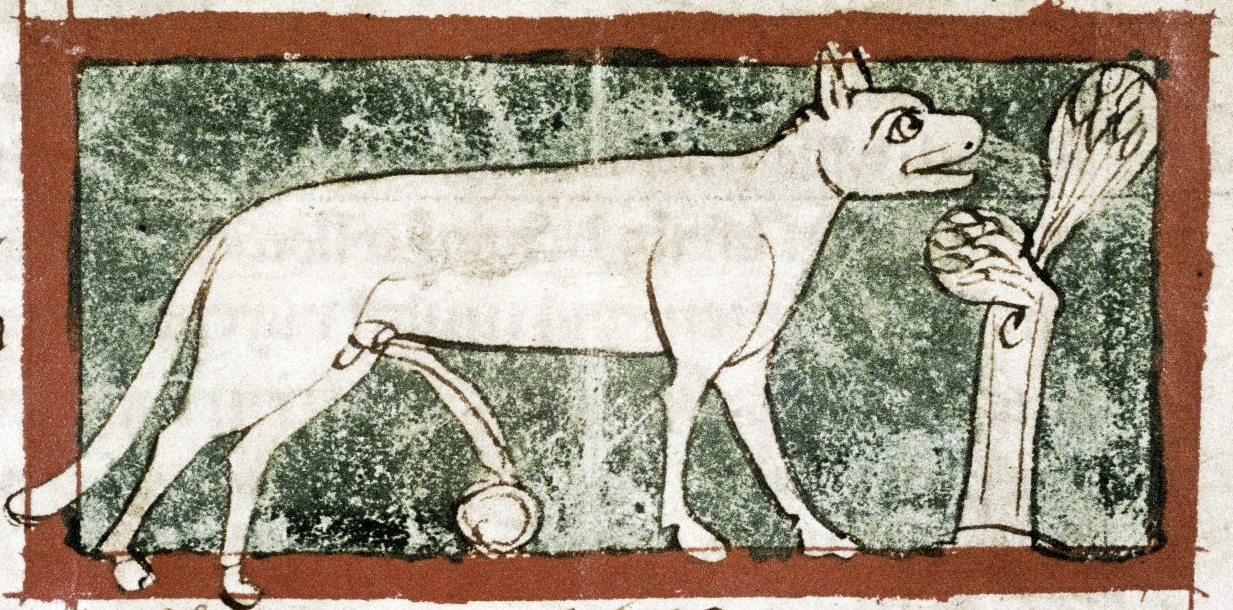
As is usual in bestiaries, the lynx in this late 13th-century English manuscript is shown urinating, the urine turning to the mythical stone lyngurium.

Lyngurium or Ligurium is the name of a mythical gemstone believed to be formed of the solidified urine of the lynx (the best ones coming from wild males). It was included in classical and "almost every medieval lapidary" or book of gems until it gradually disappeared from view in the 17th century.

== Properties and history ==
As well as various medical properties, lyngurium was credited with the power to attract objects, including metal; in fact it seems likely that what was thought to be lyngurium was either a type of yellow amber, which was known to the Ancient Greeks, but obtained from the distant Baltic coast, or less likely forms of tourmaline. The first surviving description of Lyngurium is by Theophrastus (c. 371 – c. 287 BC), and most later descriptions derive from his account. Theophrastus said it was:

...carved into signets and is hard as any stone, [and] has an unusual power. For it attracts other objects just as amber does, and some people claim that it acts not only on straws and leaves, but also on thin pieces of copper and iron, as Diocles maintained. The lyngurium is cold and very clear. A wild lynx produces better stones than a tame animal, and a male better ones than a female, there being a difference in the diet, in the exercise taken or not taken, and, in general, in the natural constitution of the body, in as much as the body is drier in the case of the former and more moist in the case of the latter. The stone is discovered only when experienced searchers dig it up, for when the lynx has passed its urine, it conceals it and scrapes soil over it.

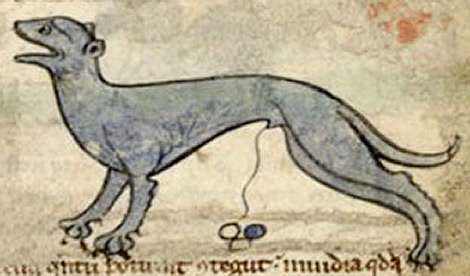
Lapis lynxurius

In the 1st century AD Pliny the Elder discusses the stone, but makes it clear that he does not believe in it, or at least its supposed origin: "I for my part am of the opinion that the whole story is false and that no gemstone bearing this name has been seen in our time. Also false are the statements made simultaneously about its medical properties, to the effect that when it is taken in liquid it breaks up stones in the bladder, and that it relieves jaundice if it is swallowed in wine or even looked at". He also mentioned the belief that the hiding of the solidified urine was because lynxes had a "grudge against mankind", and deliberately hid what they knew to be highly beneficial objects for man. This idea was apparently also mentioned by Theophrastus in a different, lost work, On creatures said to be grudging, and was still alive in the 15th century: "she hidith it for envy that hire vertues shulde not helpe vs". Another version was that the lynx swallowed the stone and "withholt in his throte wel depe that the grete vertues there-of ne shulde nought be helpyng to vs" ("withholds it in his throat knowing that the virtues thereof should not be helping us").

The belief that male urine produced better stones related to a general ancient and medieval idea that inorganic materials could be gendered into generally superior male forms and their weaker female forms. The 11th century Islamic scientist Abū Rayḥān al-Bīrūnī was critical of a popular belief, not mentioned in other sources, that the stone could make people change gender.

The meaning and origin of the word seems to have been confused early on with a geographical origin, either in Liguria in northern Italy, or a part of Sicily which produced amber. A version of the name, apparently started by Flavius Josephus was ligure, and under this name the Vulgate Latin Bible described the seventh stone on the Priestly breastplate in the Book of Exodus, called either amber or jacinth in modern translations, though one 19th-century Danish translation used lyncuren.

== Renaissance scepticism ==
Although "the first English zoology" The Noble Lyte and Nature of Man (1521) written or at least printed by Lawrence Andrewe, still said that the lynx's "pisse baketh in ye sonne and that becommeth a ryche stone", by 1607 the clergyman Edward Topsell, though repeating many fabulous medieval beliefs about zoology, rejected lyngurium: "Latines did feigne an etymology of the word Lyncurium and uppon this weake foundation have they raised that vaine buildinge". The death of belief in lyngurium generated a few attempts to find more scientific explanations, and a considerable amount of scholarly squabbling, but the absence of physical specimens was soon fatal.

== See also ==
- Hyraceum
- Toadstone
