= Twelve Stones =

Stones of the Twelve Tribes of Israel

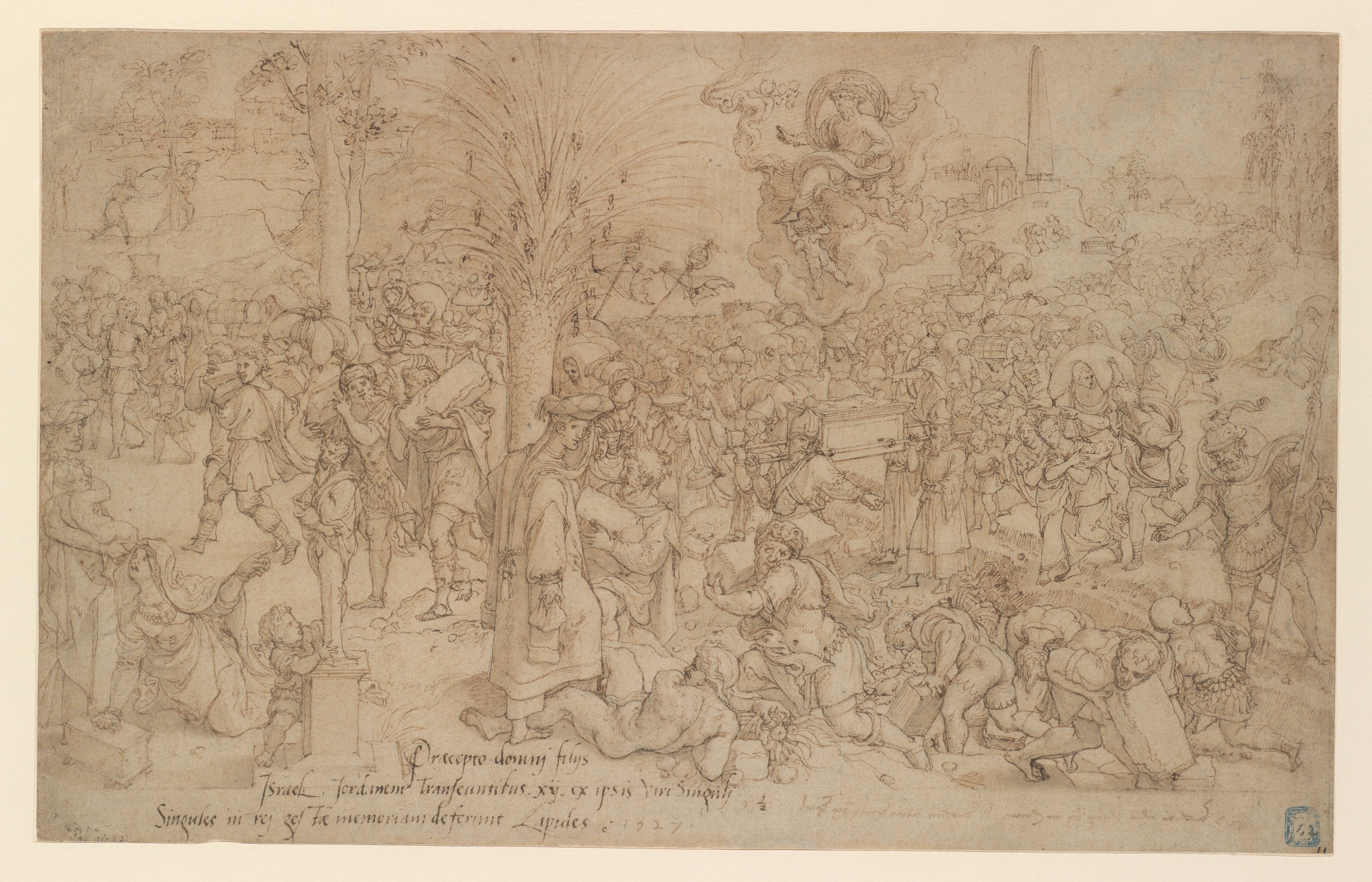
The Jews Collecting the Twelve Stones from the River Jordan by Pieter Coecke van Aelst (c. 1535–38)

The Twelve Stones (Hebrew: מצבות, romanized: maṣṣəwoṯ) are steles, a common form of marking a spectacular religious event in the days of Kingdom of Judah before the time of King Josiah (Deuteronomy 27:1–8). According to the Bible, the steles were specifically placed in a circle at Gilgal, where the heads of each tribe stood at the meeting that the Twelve Tribes had with Joshua as their leader immediately following the crossing of the Jordan River into the land of Israel (Joshua 4:1–11)). This was practiced for a limited period of time in the northern Kingdom of Israel.

Similarly, the prophet Elijah used twelve stones (Hebrew: אֲבָנִים, romanized: ʾəvānim, lit. 'stones') to build an altar (1 Kings 18:30–31). The stones were from a broken altar that had been built on Mount Carmel before the First Temple was erected. Upon the completion of the Temple, offerings on other altars became forbidden. What was unique with Elijah's altar was that God would ignite the offering with fire (or lightning) from heaven. The timing of this display made it the most spectacular religious event since the Exodus. Use of a twelve stone monument became a form of marking a spectacular event. King Josiah abolished the practice because some people attached religious significance to the stones themselves, resembling idolatry.

== See also ==
- Priestly breastplate – Jewish ritual object worn by the High Priest
