= Abnu šikinšu =

Abnu šikinšu, inscribed NA_{4} GAR-šú, “the stone whose appearance is...,” is one of the most prominent Mesopotamian examples of a lapidary, or “stone identification handbook.” It provides a list of the names of minerals and highlights their therapeutic or magical use. It is currently extant in six fragments: from Sultantepe, ancient Huzirina, (Note: STT 108 tablet VAT 13940+) (Note: STT 109) Assur, (Note: BAM IV 378.) (Note: BAM 194 vii (=KAR 185, VAT 9587).) Kuyunjik, ancient Nineveh (Note: K. 4751.) and a late Babylonian exemplar from Sippar (Note: BM 50664.) Differences in the surviving copies indicate that more than one version was in circulation in ancient times although its listing in the Exorcists Manual indicates its centrality in the training curriculum of the aspiring ašipu, or exorcist.

== The text ==
The work describes the differences of stones in color, design, and function, such as “the name of the stone which looks like unripe grapes is abašmû” and “as a lump of salt is called stone for childbirth.” Some stones are associated with the heavens. Jasper (NA_{4}-aš-pu) is likened to the clear heavens and a rain cloud and represents the lower heavens due to its greenish or bluish hue, the color of the sky. The stone of the middle heaven is described: "The stone whose appearance is like lapis-lazuli is named saggilmud-stone,” The stone of the upper heavens is then described as “The stone whose appearance is red, covered with white and black patches is named (of) luludānītu stone."

The ašgikû-stone, powders of which were used in medical prescriptions to treat pulsating veins in the temples, is described: “the appearance of the stone resembles green obsidian, but [with/without] the striations. As for this stone, ašgikû is its name.” Statues representing šēdu and lamassu figures were made from specific stones to repel the evildoer. A stone described as like black obsidian was used “to dispel the wrath of the (personal) god.” The ḫusīgu-stone was used in a stone charm preventing a ḫa'attu-demon from attacking the person who wears it. The stone KA.GI.NA.DIB, the stone of truthfulness, “reports to Šamaš what he (the wearer) says, truth as well as falsehood” and “only a pious man should wear it.”

References to Abnu šikinšu also appear in neo-Babylonian texts, such as the colophon of a stone list (Note: BM 38385 vi 17.) and another tablet (Note: BM 77806.) of a similar genre which is not part of the series but preserves its name.
