= Old English Lapidary =

The so-called Old English Lapidary (Cotton Tiberius A.iii) is a 10th or 11th century Old English lapidary, a translation of older Latin glosses on the precious stones mentioned in the Book of Revelation.
