= Lapidary Point =

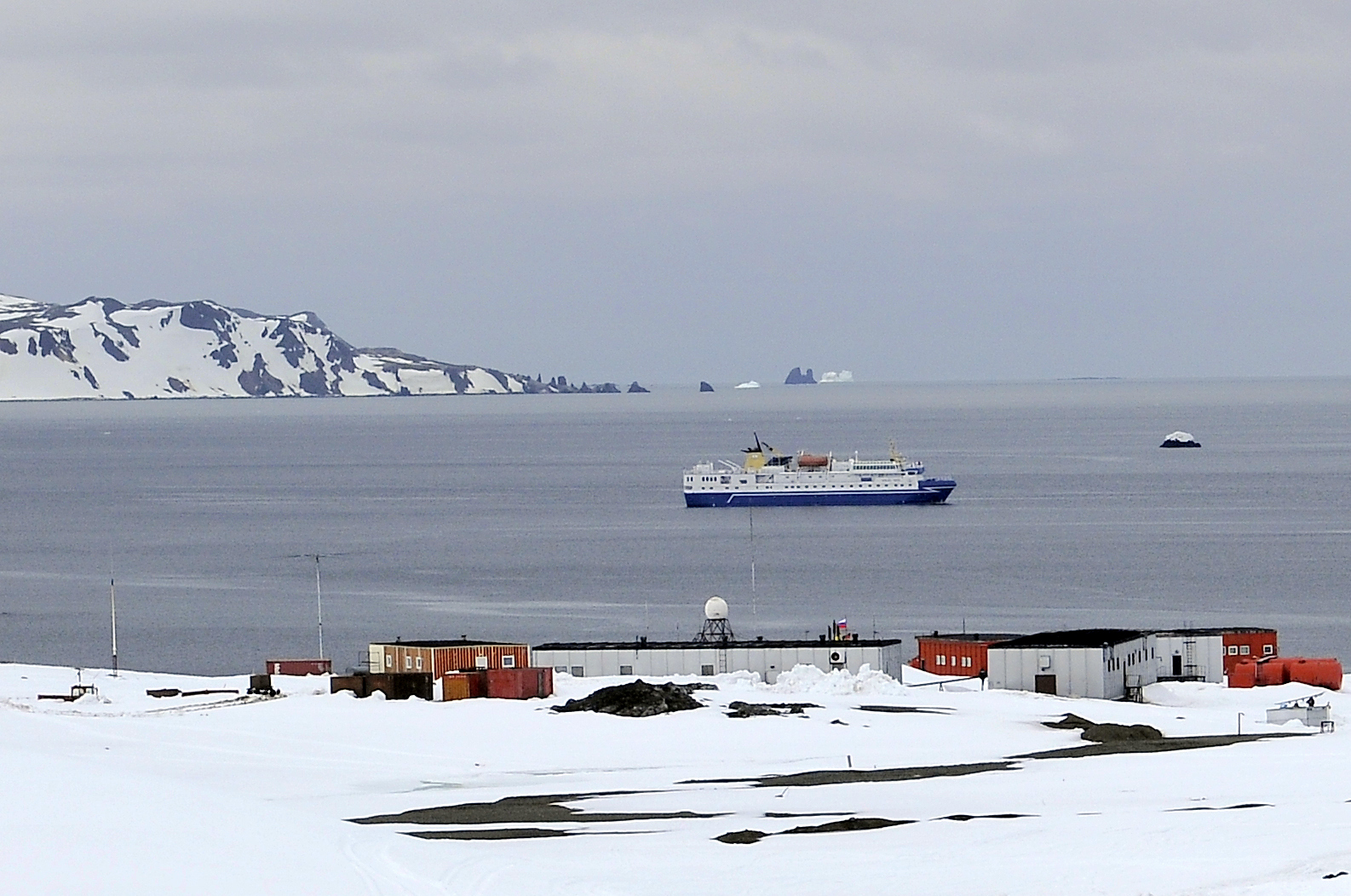
Lapidary Point

Lapidary Point (62°11′48″S 58°56′01″W) is the southwest entrance point to Rocky Cove, Maxwell Bay, King George Island, Antarctica. It was named "Mys Kamennyy" (rocky cape) by G.E. Grikurov and M.M. Polyakov in 1968, following Soviet Antarctic Expedition surveys in the area. This was translated as Lapidary Point by the UK Antarctic Place-Names Committee in 1978.
