= Theophrastus =

Greek philosopher (c. 371 – c. 287 BC)

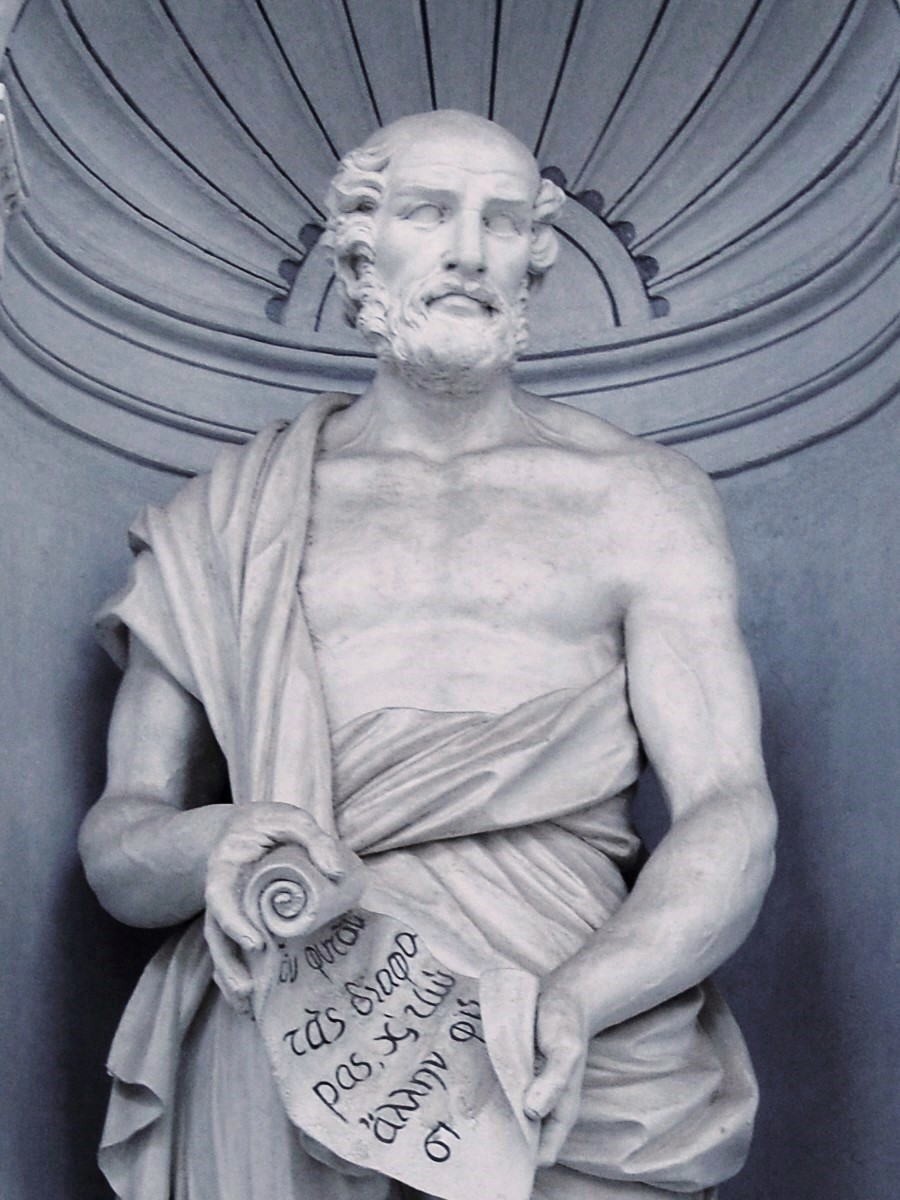
- Statue of Theophrastus, Palermo Botanical Garden
- Born: c. 371 BC; Eresos
- Died: c. 287 BC (aged 83 or 84); Athens

Philosophical work
- Era: Ancient philosophy
- Region: Western philosophy
- School: Peripatetic school
- Main interests: Ethics, grammar, history, logic, metaphysics, natural history, physics, botany
- Notable ideas: Prosleptic and hypothetical syllogisms; Modus ponens and modus tollens

Theophrastus (/ˌθiː.əˈfræstəs/; Ancient Greek: Θεόφραστος, romanized: Theophrastos, lit. 'godly phrased'; c. 371 – c. 287 BC) was an ancient Greek philosopher and naturalist. A native of Eresos in Lesbos, he was Aristotle's close colleague and successor as head of the Lyceum, the Peripatetic school of philosophy in Athens. Theophrastus wrote numerous treatises across all areas of philosophy, working to support, improve, expand, and develop the Aristotelian system. He made significant contributions to various fields, including ethics, metaphysics, botany, and natural history. Often considered the "father of botany" for his groundbreaking works "Enquiry into Plants" (Ancient Greek: Περὶ φυτῶν ἱστορία, romanized: Peri phytōn historia) and "On the Causes of Plants", (Ancient Greek: Περὶ αἰτιῶν φυτικῶν, romanized: Peri aitiōn phytikōn), Theophrastus established the foundations of botanical science. His given name was Tyrtamos (Ancient Greek: Τύρταμος); the nickname Theophrastus ("divine speaker") was reputedly given to him by Aristotle in recognition of his eloquent style.

He came to Athens at a young age and initially studied in Plato's school. After Plato's death, he attached himself to Aristotle who took to Theophrastus in his writings. When Aristotle fled Athens, Theophrastus took over as head of the Lyceum. Theophrastus presided over the Peripatetic school for thirty-six years, during which time the school flourished greatly. He is often considered the father of botany for his works on plants. After his death, the Athenians honoured him with a public funeral. His successor as head of the school was Strato of Lampsacus.

The interests of Theophrastus were wide ranging, including biology, physics, ethics and metaphysics. His two surviving botanical works, Enquiry into Plants (Historia Plantarum) and On the Causes of Plants, were an important influence on Renaissance science. There are also surviving works On Moral Characters, On Sense Perception, and On Stones, as well as fragments on Physics and Metaphysics. In philosophy, he studied grammar and language and continued Aristotle's work on logic. He also viewed space as merely the arrangement and position of bodies, time as a byproduct of motion, and motion as an inevitable result of all activity. In ethics, he regarded happiness as depending on external influences as well as on virtue.

== Life ==
Most of the biographical information about Theophrastus was provided by Diogenes Laërtius's Lives and Opinions of Eminent Philosophers, written more than four hundred years after Theophrastus's time. He was a native of Eresos in Lesbos. His given name was Tyrtamus (Τύρταμος), but he later became known by the nickname "Theophrastus", given to him, it is said, by Aristotle to indicate the grace of his conversation (from Ancient Greek Θεός 'god' and φράζειν 'to phrase', i.e. divine expression).

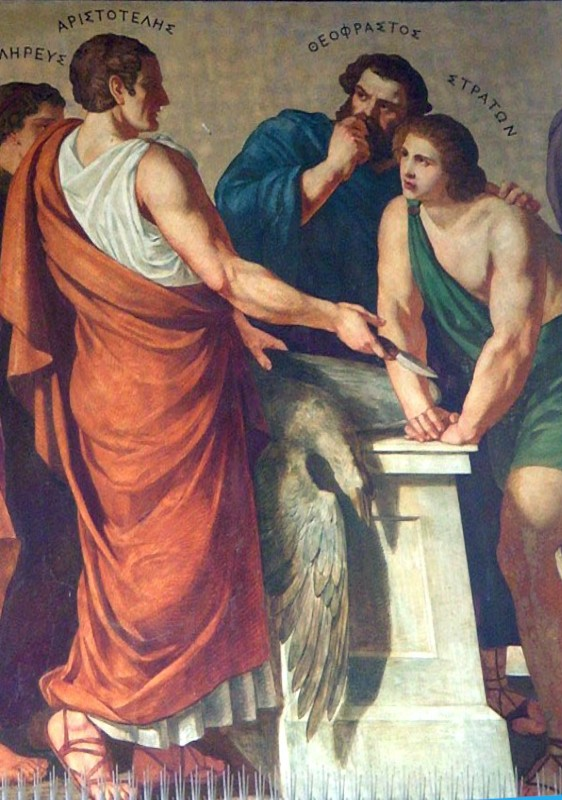
Aristotle, Theophrastus, and Strato of Lampsacus. Part of a fresco in the portico of the University of Athens painted by Carl Rahl, c. 1888.

After receiving instruction in philosophy on Lesbos from one Alcippus, he moved to Athens, where he may have studied under Plato. (Note: "Theophrastus is said to have studied first at Eresus under Alcippus, then at Athens under Plato. The latter report is problematic; but if true, it would explain an early association with Aristotle."(Encyclopedia of classical philosophy 1997, p. 552).) He became friends with Aristotle, and when Plato died (348/7 BC) Theophrastus may have joined Aristotle in his self-imposed exile from Athens. When Aristotle moved to Mytilene on Lesbos in 345/4, it is very likely that he did so at the urging of Theophrastus. It seems that it was on Lesbos that Aristotle and Theophrastus began their research into natural science, with Aristotle studying animals and Theophrastus studying plants. Theophrastus probably accompanied Aristotle to Macedonia when Aristotle was appointed tutor to Alexander the Great in 343/2. Around 335 BC, Theophrastus moved with Aristotle to Athens, where Aristotle began teaching in the Lyceum. When, after the death of Alexander, anti-Macedonian feeling forced Aristotle to leave Athens, Theophrastus remained behind as head (scholarch) of the Peripatetic school, a position he continued to hold after Aristotle's death in 322/1.

Aristotle in his will made him guardian of his children, including Nicomachus, with whom he was close. (Note: "Aristippus in the fourth book of his treatise On Ancient Luxury asserts that he was enamored of Aristotle's son Nicomachus" (Laërtius 1925, § 38).) Aristotle likewise bequeathed to him his library and the originals of his works, (Note: "It may we be that we owe to Theophrastus the publication of some at least of his master's voluminous works" (Hort).) and designated him as his successor at the Lyceum. Eudemus of Rhodes also had some claims to this position, and Aristoxenus is said to have resented Aristotle's choice.

Theophrastus presided over the Peripatetic school for 35 years, and died at age 85, according to Diogenes. (Note: "He is made indeed to say in the probably spurious Preface to the Characters that he is writing in his ninety-ninth year; while St. Jerome's Chronicle asserts that he lived to the age of 107" (Hort).) He is said to have remarked, "We die just when we are beginning to live".

Under his guidance, the school flourished greatly—there were at one period more than 2,000 students, Diogenes affirms—and at his death, according to the terms of his will preserved by Diogenes, he bequeathed to it his garden with house and colonnades as a permanent seat of instruction. The comic poet Menander was among his pupils. His popularity was shown in the regard paid to him by Philip, Cassander, and Ptolemy, and by the complete failure of a charge of impiety brought against him. He was honored with a public funeral, and "the whole population of Athens, honouring him greatly, followed him to the grave." He was succeeded as head of the Lyceum by Strato of Lampsacus.

== Writings ==
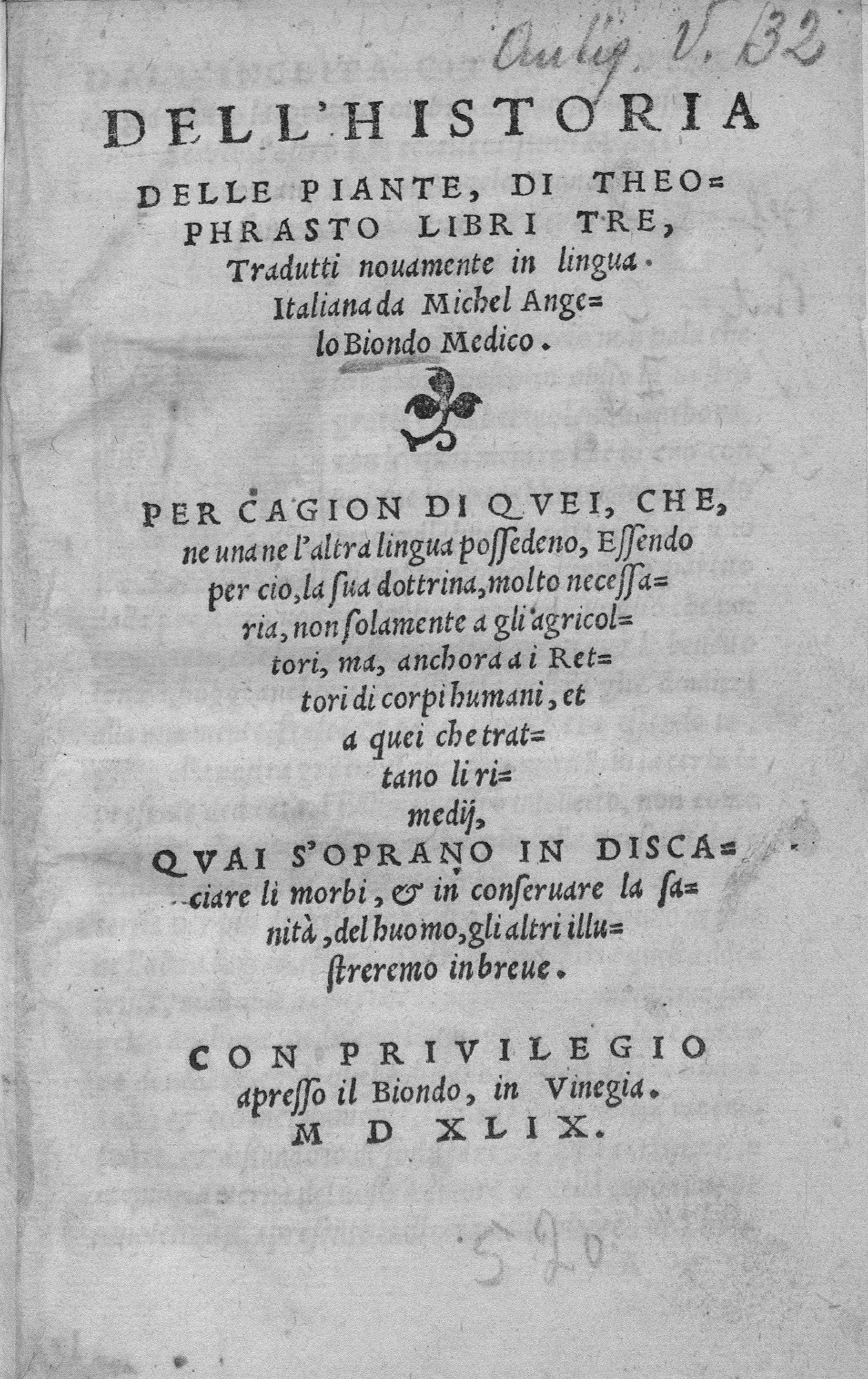
Historia plantarum, 1549

From the lists of Diogenes, giving 227 titles, it appears that the activity of Theophrastus extended over the whole field of contemporary knowledge. His writing probably differed little from Aristotle's treatment of the same themes, though supplementary in details. Like Aristotle, most of his writings are lost works. Thus Theophrastus, like Aristotle, had composed a first and second Analytic (Ἀναλυτικῶν προτέρων and Ἀναλυτικῶν ὑστέρων). He had also written books on Topics (Ἀνηγμένων τόπων, Τοπικῶν and Τὰ πρὸ τῶν τόπων); on the Analysis of Syllogisms (Περὶ ἀναλύσεως συλλογισμῶν and Περὶ συλλογισμῶν λύσεως), on Sophisms (Σοφισμάτων) and on Affirmation and Denial (Περὶ καταφάσεως καὶ ἀποφάσεως) as well as on the Natural Philosophy (Περὶ φύσεως, Περὶ φυσικῶν, Φυσικῶν and others), on Heaven (Περὶ οὐρανοῦ), and on Meteorological Phenomena (Τῆς μεταρσιολεσχίας and Μεταρσιολογικῶν).

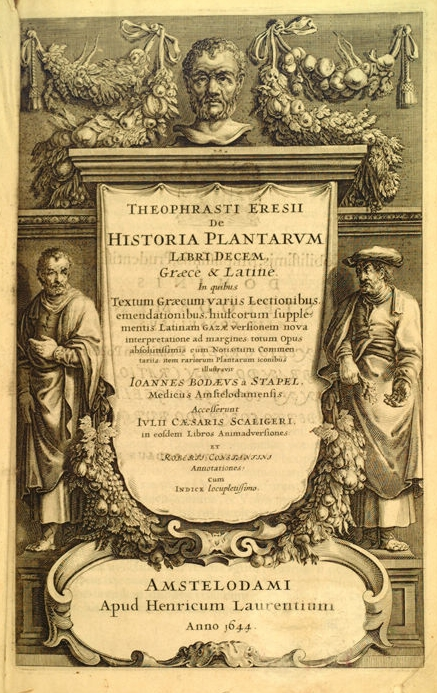
Frontispiece to the illustrated 1644 edition of the Enquiry into Plants (Historia Plantarum)

In addition, Theophrastus wrote on the Warm and the Cold (Περὶ θερμοῦ καὶ ψυχροῦ), on Water (Περὶ ὕδατος), Fire (Περὶ πυρóς), the Sea (Περὶ θαλάττης), on Coagulation and Melting (Περὶ πήξεων καὶ τήξεων), on various phenomena of organic and spiritual life, and on the Soul (Περὶ ψυχῆς), on Experience (Περὶ ἐμπειρίας) and On Sense Perception (also known as On the Senses; Περὶ αἰσθήσεων). Likewise, we find mention of monographs of Theophrastus on the early Greek philosophers Anaximenes, Anaxagoras, Empedocles, Archelaus, Diogenes of Apollonia, Democritus, which were made use of by Simplicius; and also on Xenocrates, against the Academics, and a sketch of the political doctrine of Plato.

He studied general history, as we know from Plutarch's lives of Lycurgus, Solon, Aristides, Pericles, Nicias, Alcibiades, Lysander, Agesilaus, and Demosthenes, which were probably borrowed from the work on Lives (Περὶ βίων). But his main efforts were to continue the labours of Aristotle in natural history. This is testified to not only by a number of treatises on individual subjects of zoology, of which, besides the titles, only fragments remain, but also by his books On Stones, his Enquiry into Plants, and On the Causes of Plants (see below), which have come down to us entire. In politics, also, he seems to have trodden in the footsteps of Aristotle. Besides his books on the State (Πολιτικῶν and Πολιτικοῦ), we find quoted various treatises on Education (Περὶ παιδείας βασιλέως and Περὶ παιδείας), on Royalty (Περὶ βασιλείας, Περὶ παιδείας βασιλέως and Πρὸς Κάσανδρον περὶ βασιλείας), on the Best State (Περὶ τῆς ἀρίστης πολιτείας), on Political Morals (Πολιτικῶν ἐθῶν), and particularly his works on the Laws (Νόμων κατὰ στοιχεῖον, Νόμων ἐπιτομῆς and Περὶ νόμων), one of which, containing a recapitulation of the laws of various barbarian as well as Greek states, was intended to be a companion to Aristotle's outline of Politics, and must have been similar to it. He also wrote on oratory and poetry. Theophrastus, without doubt, departed further from Aristotle in his ethical writings, as also in his metaphysical investigations of motion, the soul, and God.

Besides these writings, Theophrastus wrote several collections of problems, out of which some things at least have passed into the Problems that have come down to us under the name of Aristotle, and commentaries, partly dialogue, to which probably belonged the Erotikos (Ἐρωτικός), Megacles (Μεγακλῆς), Callisthenes (Καλλισθένης), and Megarikos (Μεγαρικός), and letters, partly books on mathematical sciences and their history.

Many of his surviving works exist only in fragmentary form. "The style of these works, as of the botanical books, suggests that, as in the case of Aristotle, what we possess consists of notes for lectures or notes taken of lectures," his translator Arthur F. Hort remarks. "There is no literary charm; the sentences are mostly compressed and highly elliptical, to the point sometimes of obscurity". The text of these fragments and extracts is often so corrupt that there is a certain plausibility to the well-known story that the works of Aristotle and Theophrastus were allowed to languish in the cellar of Neleus of Scepsis and his descendants.

=== On plants ===
The most important of his books are two large botanical treatises, Enquiry into Plants (Περὶ φυτῶν ἱστορία, generally known as Historia Plantarum), and On the Causes of Plants (Greek: Περὶ αἰτιῶν φυτικῶν, Latin: De causis plantarum), which constitute the most important contribution to botanical science during antiquity and the Middle Ages, the first systemization of the botanical world; on the strength of these works some, following Linnaeus, call him the "father of botany".

The Enquiry into Plants was originally ten books, of which nine survive. The work is arranged into a system whereby plants are classified according to their modes of generation, their localities, their sizes, and according to their practical uses such as foods, juices, herbs, etc. The first book deals with the parts of plants; the second book with the reproduction of plants and the times and manner of sowing; the third, fourth, and fifth books are devoted to trees, their types, their locations, and their practical applications; the sixth book deals with shrubs and spiny plants; the seventh book deals with herbs; the eighth book deals with plants that produce edible seeds; and the ninth book deals with plants that produce useful juices, gums, resins, etc.

On the Causes of Plants was originally eight books, of which six survive. It concerns the growth of plants; the influences on their fecundity; the proper times they should be sown and reaped; the methods of preparing the soil, manuring it, and the use of tools; and of the smells, tastes, and properties of many types of plants. The work deals mainly with the economical uses of plants rather than their medicinal uses, although the latter is sometimes mentioned. A book on wines and a book on plant smells may have once been part of the complete work.

Although these works contain many absurd and fabulous statements, they include valuable observations concerning the functions and properties of plants. Theophrastus observed the process of germination and recognized the significance of climate to plants. Much of the information on the Greek plants may have come from his own observations, as he is known to have travelled throughout Greece, and to have had a botanical garden of his own; but the works also profit from the reports on plants of Asia brought back from those who followed Alexander the Great:

to the reports of Alexander's followers he owed his accounts of such plants as the cotton-plant, banyan, pepper, cinnamon, myrrh, and frankincense.

Theophrastus's Enquiry into Plants was first published in a Latin translation by Theodore Gaza, at Treviso, 1483; (Note: Theodore Gaza, a refugee from Thessalonica, was working from a lost Greek manuscript that was different from any others (Hort).) in its original Greek it first appeared from the press of Aldus Manutius at Venice, 1495–98, from a third-rate manuscript, which, like the majority of the manuscripts that were sent to printers' workshops in the fifteenth and sixteenth century, has disappeared. (Note: It was carefully copied in a printing at Basel, 1541.) Christian Wimmer identified two manuscripts of first quality, the Codex Urbinas in the Vatican Library, which was not made known to J. G. Schneider, who made the first modern critical edition, 1818–21, and the excerpts in the Codex Parisiensis in the Bibliothèque nationale de France.

=== On moral characters ===
His book Characters (originally titled Χαρακτήρες, literally Traits, also known in antiquity as Ἠθικοὶ χαρακτῆρες, literally Character Traits, and best known in the tradition simply as Characters) contains thirty brief outlines of moral types. They are the first recorded attempt at systematic character writing. The book has been regarded by some as an independent work; others incline to the view that the sketches were written from time to time by Theophrastus, and collected and edited after his death; others, again, regard the Characters as part of a larger systematic work, but the style of the book is against this. Theophrastus has found many imitators in this kind of writing, notably Joseph Hall (1608), Sir Thomas Overbury (1614–16), Bishop Earle (1628), 17-century poet Samuel Butler (1613), and Jean de La Bruyère (1688), who also translated the Characters. George Eliot also took inspiration from Theophrastus's Characters, most notably in her book of caricatures, Impressions of Theophrastus Such. Writing the "character sketch" as a scholastic exercise also originated in Theophrastus's typology.

=== On sensation ===
A treatise On Sense Perception (Περὶ αἰσθήσεων) and its objects is important for a knowledge of the doctrines of the more ancient Greek philosophers regarding the subject. A paraphrase and commentary on this work was written by Priscian of Lydia in the sixth century. With this type of work we may connect the fragments on Smells, on Fatigue, on Dizziness, on Sweat, on Swooning, on Palsy, and on Honey.

=== Physics ===
Fragments of a History of Physics (Περὶ φυσικῶν ἱστοριῶν) are extant. To this class of work belong the still extant sections on Fire, on the Winds, and on the signs of Waters, Winds, and Storms.

Various smaller scientific fragments have been collected in the editions of Johann Gottlob Schneider (1818–21) and Friedrich Wimmer (1842–62) and in Hermann Usener's Analecta Theophrastea.

=== Metaphysics ===
The Metaphysics (anachronistic Greek title: Θεοφράστου τῶν μετὰ τὰ φυσικά), in nine chapters (also known as On First Principles), was considered a fragment of a larger work by Usener in his edition (Theophrastos, Metaphysica, Bonn, 1890), but according to Ross and Fobes in their edition (Theophrastus, Metaphysica, Oxford, 1929), the treatise is complete (p. X) and this opinion is now widely accepted. There is no reason for assigning this work to some other author because it is not noticed in Hermippus and Andronicus, especially as Nicolaus of Damascus had already mentioned it.

=== On stones ===
In his treatise On Stones (Περὶ λίθων), which would become a source for other lapidaries until at least the Renaissance, Theophrastus classified rocks and gems based on their behavior when heated, further grouping minerals by common properties, such as amber and magnetite, which both have the power of attraction.

Theophrastus describes different marbles; mentions coal, which he says is used for heating by metal-workers; describes the various metal ores; and knew that pumice stones had a volcanic origin. He also deals with precious stones, emeralds, amethysts, onyx, jasper, etc., and describes a variety of "sapphire" that was blue with veins of gold, and thus was presumably lapis lazuli.

He knew that pearls came from shellfish, that coral came from India, and speaks of the fossilized remains of organic life. He also considers the practical uses of various stones, such as the minerals necessary for the manufacture of glass; for the production of various pigments of paint such as ochre; and for the manufacture of plaster.

Many of the rarer minerals were found in mines, and Theophrastus mentions the famous copper mines of Cyprus and the even more famous silver mines, presumably of Laurium near Athens – the basis of the wealth of the city – as well as referring to gold mines. The Laurium silver mines, which were the property of the state, were usually leased for a fixed sum and a percentage on the working. Towards the end of the fifth century BCE the output fell, partly owing to the Spartan occupation of Decelea from c. 413 BCE. But the mines continued to be worked, though Strabo (c. 64 BCE to c. 24 CE) records that in his time the tailings were being worked over, and Pausanias (c. 110 to c. 180) speaks of the mines as a thing of the past. The ancient workings, consisting of shafts and galleries for excavating the ore, and washing tables for extracting the metal, may still be seen. Theophrastus wrote a separate work On Mining, which – like most of his writings – is a lost work.

Pliny the Elder makes clear references to his use of On Stones in his Naturalis Historia of 77 AD, while updating and making much new information available on minerals himself. Although Pliny's treatment of the subject is more extensive, Theophrastus is more systematic and his work is comparatively free from fable and magic, although he did describe lyngurium, a gemstone supposedly formed of the solidified urine of the lynx (the best ones coming from wild males), which featured in many lapidaries until it gradually disappeared from view in the 17th century. It is mistakenly attributed to Theophrastus the first record of pyroelectricity. The misconception arose soon after the discovery of the pyroelectric properties of tourmaline, which made mineralogists of the time associate the lyngurium with it. Lyngurium is described in the work of Theophrastus as being similar to amber, capable of attracting "straws and bits of wood", but without specifying any pyroelectric properties.

==== Publication History ====
According to Eichholz (1965) the manuscript tradition of On Stones is preserved in 13 medieval greek manuscripts, none dating to before the 13th century. FKML, DJBH and CEAGN all form distinct families within the stemma codicum, with CEAGN and D as the joint most conservative.

| Siglum | Library | Shelfmark | Date (century) | Source |
|---|---|---|---|---|
| A | Vatican | 1302 | 13th-14th | |
| B | Vatican | 1305 | 1469-77 | |
| C | Vatican | Urb Gr 108 | 15th | |
| D | Vatican | Pal Gr 162 | 1442-59 | |
| E | Vatican | Ott Gr 153 | 15th | |
| F | Vatican | Reg Gr 123 | 1499-1501 | |
| G | Ambrosiana | P. 80 Sup. | 15th | |
| H | Naples | III D 1 | 1497 | |
| J | Marcian | Gr 260 | 1442-59 | |
| K | Bern | 402 | 15th | |
| L | Vossianus | Gr Q25 | 1487 | |
| M | British Library | Add. Ms. 5113 | 1480-7 | |
| N | BnF | Gr 2277 | c.1479 | |

The editio princeps published by Manuzio Aldo in 1497 together with collected works of Aristotle. This text was reprinted in the Basle edition of Oporinus in 1541, and in the Aldine edition of Camotius in 1552. The first separate text of the work, issued by Morel at Paris in 1577, was a vast improvement on that of the previous editions.

== Philosophy ==
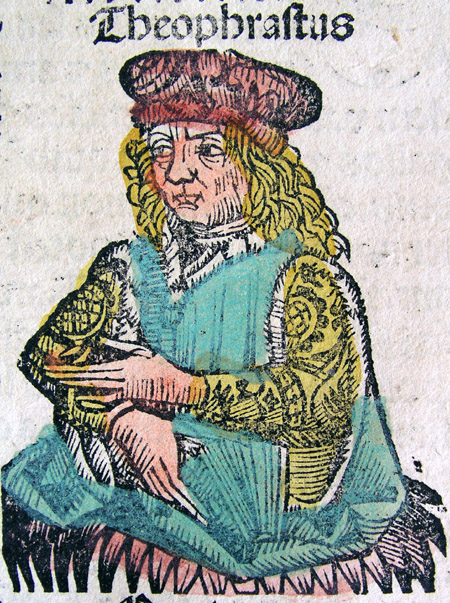
Theophrastus, depicted as a medieval scholar in the Nuremberg Chronicle

The extent to which Theophrastus followed Aristotle's doctrines, or defined them more accurately, or conceived them in a different form, and what additional structures of thought he placed upon them, can only be partially determined because of the loss of so many of his writings. Many of his opinions have to be reconstructed from the works of later writers such as Alexander of Aphrodisias and Simplicius.

=== Logic ===
Theophrastus seems to have carried out still further the grammatical foundation of logic and rhetoric, since in his book on the elements of speech, he distinguished the main parts of speech from the subordinate parts, and also direct expressions (κυρία λέξις kuria lexis) from metaphorical expressions, and dealt with the emotions (πάθη pathe) of speech. He further distinguished a twofold reference of speech (σχίσις schisis) to things (πράγματα pragmata) and to the hearers, and referred poetry and rhetoric to the latter.

He wrote at length on the unity of judgment, on the different kinds of negation, and on the difference between unconditional and conditional necessity. In his doctrine of syllogisms he brought forward the proof for the conversion of universal affirmative judgments, differed from Aristotle here and there in the laying down and arranging the modi of the syllogisms, partly in the proof of them, partly in the doctrine of mixture, i.e. of the influence of the modality of the premises upon the modality of the conclusion. Then, in two separate works, he dealt with the reduction of arguments to the syllogistic form and on the resolution of them; and further, with hypothetical conclusions. For the doctrine of proof, Galen quotes the second Analytic of Theophrastus, in conjunction with that of Aristotle, as the best treatises on that doctrine. In different monographs he seems to have tried to expand it into a general theory of science. To this, too, may have belonged the proposition quoted from his Topics, that the principles of opposites are themselves opposed, and cannot be deduced from one and the same higher genus. For the rest, some minor deviations from the Aristotelian definitions are quoted from the Topica of Theophrastus. Closely connected with this treatise was that upon ambiguous words or ideas, which, without doubt, corresponded to book Ε of Aristotle's Metaphysics.

=== Physics and metaphysics ===
Theophrastus introduced his Physics with the proof that all natural existence, being corporeal and composite, requires principles, and first and foremost, motion, as the basis of all change. Denying the substance of space, he seems to have regarded it, in opposition to Aristotle, as the mere arrangement and position (taxis and thesis) of bodies. Time he called an accident of motion, without, it seems, viewing it, with Aristotle, as the numerical determinant of motion. He attacked the doctrine of the four classical elements and challenged whether fire could be called a primary element when it appears to be compound, requiring, as it does, another material for its own nutriment.

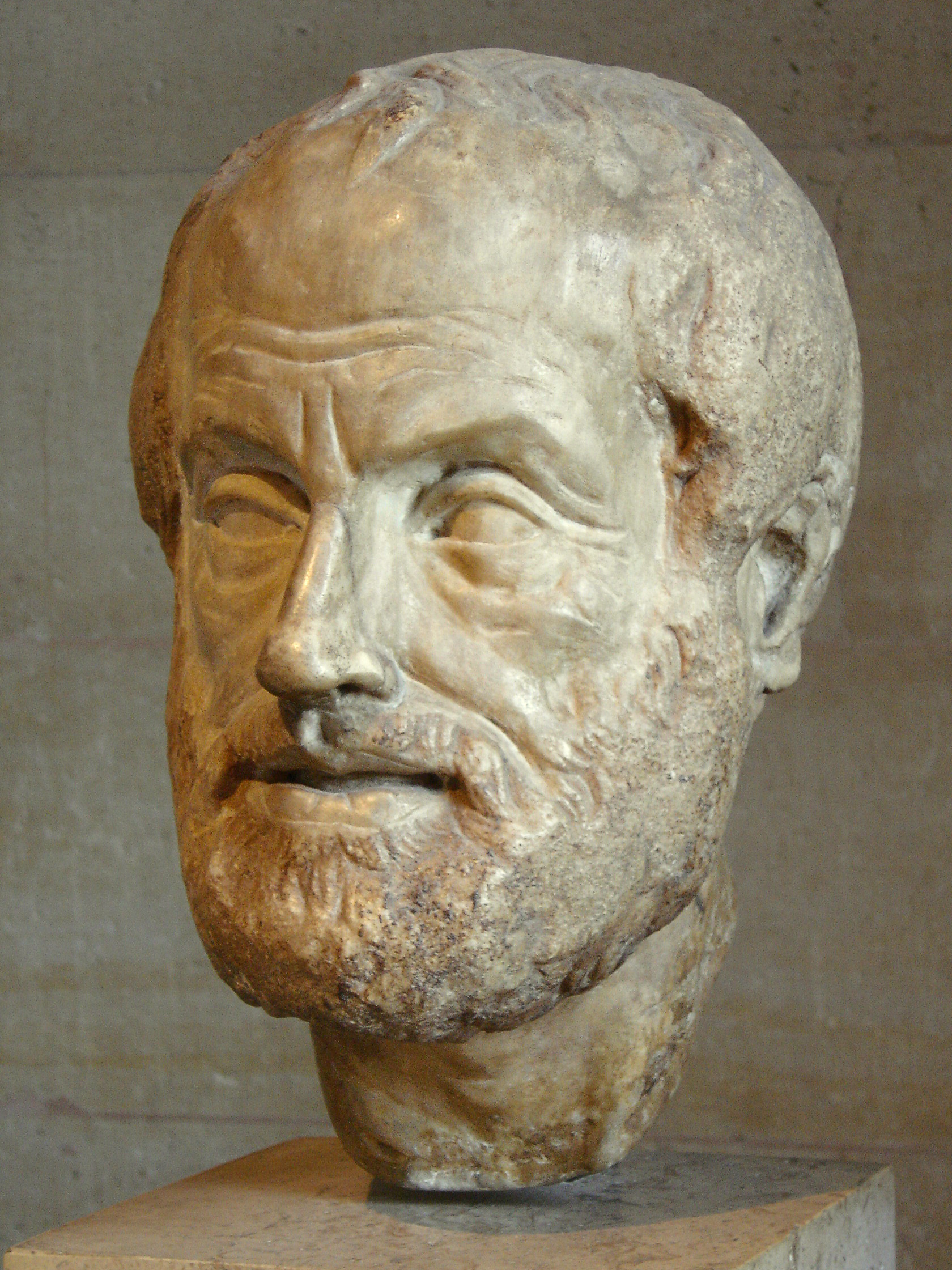
Aristotle

He departed more widely from Aristotle in his doctrine of motion, since on the one hand he extended it over all categories, and did not limit it to those laid down by Aristotle. He viewed motion, with Aristotle, as an activity, not carrying its own goal in itself (ateles), of that which only potentially exists, but he opposed Aristotle's view that motion required a special explanation, and he regarded it as something proper both to nature in general and the celestial system in particular:

Surely, then, if the life in animals does not need explanation or is to be explained only in this way, may it not be the case that in the heavens too, and in the heavenly bodies, movement does not need explanation or is to be explained in a special way?

— Theophrastus, Metaphysics, 10a.16–29.

He recognised no activity without motion, and so referred all activities of the soul to motion: the desires and emotions to corporeal motion, judgment (kriseis) and contemplation to spiritual motion. The idea of a spirit entirely independent of organic activity, must therefore have appeared to him very doubtful; yet he appears to have contented himself with developing his doubts and difficulties on the point, without positively rejecting it. Other Peripatetics, like Dicaearchus, Aristoxenus, and especially Strato, developed further this naturalism in Aristotelian doctrine.

Theophrastus seems, generally speaking, where the investigation overstepped the limits of experience, to have preferred to develop the difficulties rather than solve them, as is especially apparent in his Metaphysics. He was doubtful of Aristotle's teleology and recommended that such ideas be used with caution:

With regard to the view that all things are for the sake of an end and nothing is in vain, the assignation of ends is in general not easy, as it is usually stated to be ... we must set certain limits to purposiveness and to the effort after the best, and not assert it to exist in all cases without qualification.

— Theophrastus, Metaphysics, 10a.22–24, 11a.1–3.

He did not follow the incessant attempts by Aristotle to refer phenomena to their ultimate foundations, or his attempts to unfold the internal connections between the latter, and between them and phenomena. In antiquity, it was a subject of complaint that Theophrastus had not expressed himself with precision and consistency respecting God, and had understood it at one time as Heaven, at another an (enlivening) breath (pneuma).

=== Ethics ===
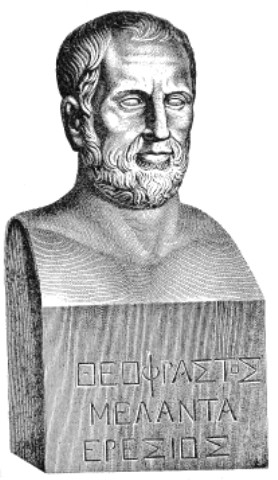
The bust inscribed "Θεόφραστος Μελάντα Ἐρέσιος (Theophrastos Melanta Eresios)"

Theophrastus did not allow a happiness resting merely upon virtue, or, consequently, to hold fast by the unconditional value of morality. He subordinated moral requirements to the advantage at least of a friend, and had allowed in prosperity the existence of an influence injurious to them. In later times, fault was found with his expression in the Callisthenes, "life is ruled by fortune, not wisdom" (vitam regit fortuna non sapientia). That in the definition of pleasure, likewise, he did not coincide with Aristotle, seems to be indicated by the titles of two of his writings, one of which dealt with pleasure generally, the other with pleasure as Aristotle had defined it. Although, like his teacher, he preferred contemplative (theoretical), to active (practical) life, he preferred to set the latter free from the restraints of family life, etc. in a manner of which Aristotle would not have approved.

Theophrastus was opposed to eating meat on the grounds that it robbed animals of life and was therefore unjust. Non-human animals, he said, can reason, sense, and feel just as human beings do.

== The "portrait" of Theophrastus ==
The marble herm figure with the bearded head of philosopher type, bearing the explicit inscription, must be taken as purely conventional. Unidentified portrait heads did not find a ready market in post-Renaissance Rome. (Note: "Since 'unknown portraits' were not valued highly, identifying inscriptions were often added to classical portraits by antiquaries and collectors before modern scholarship condemned the practice", notes Eugene Dwyer.) This bust was formerly in the collection of marchese Pietro Massimi at Palazzo Massimi and belonged to marchese L. Massimi at the time the engraving was made. It is now in the Villa Albani, Rome (inv. 1034). The inscribed bust has often been illustrated in engravings and photographs: a photograph of it forms the frontispiece to the Loeb Classical Library Theophrastus: Enquiry into Plants vol. I, 1916. André Thevet illustrated in his iconographic compendium, Les vraies Pourtrats et vies des Hommes Illustres (Paris, 1584), an alleged portrait plagiarized from the bust, supporting his fraud with the invented tale that he had obtained it from the library of a Greek in Cyprus and that he had seen a confirming bust in the ruins of Antioch.

== In popular culture ==
- "Theophrastus", second middle name of 16th century alchemist Paracelsus.
- Impressions of Theophrastus Such, a fictional work by George Eliot, published 1879, comprising character studies ostensibly written by the eponymous Such.
- "Theophrastus", a planet in the 2014 Firefly graphic novel Serenity: Leaves on the Wind.
- "Theophrastus", the given name of Dr. Seuss, pen-name of Theodor Geisel.
- Theophrastus, a 2001 board game in which players compete in a series of Alchemy experiments to become Theophrastus's apprentice.

== Works ==
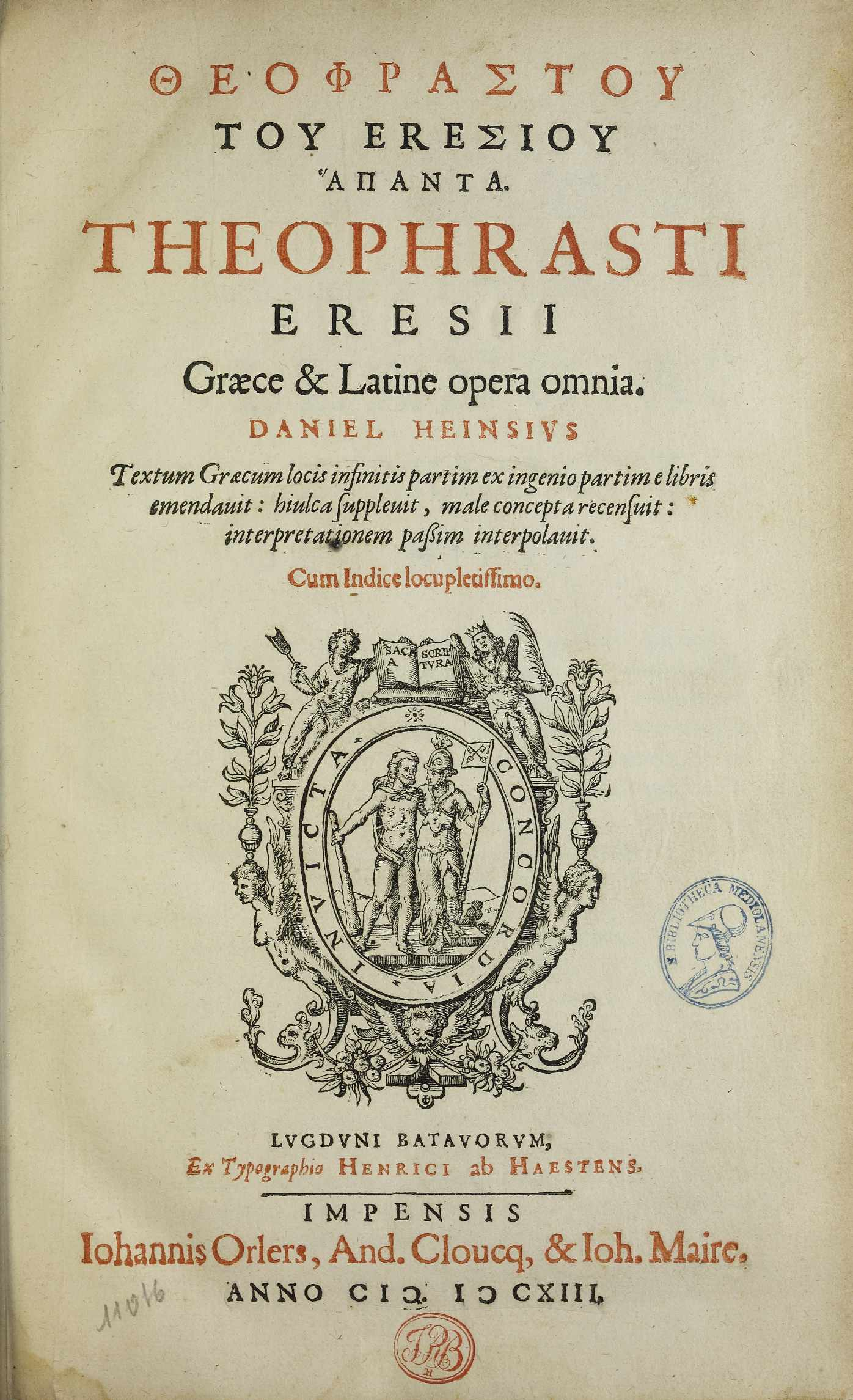
Opera omnia, 1613

- Historia plantarum (in Italian). Venezia. 1549.
- [Opere] (in Latin). Leiden: Henrick Lodewijcxsoon van Haestens. 1613.
- Metaphysics (or On First Principles).
  - Translated by M. van Raalte, 1993, Brill.
  - On First Principles. Translated by Dimitri Gutas, 2010, Brill.
- Enquiry into Plants: Books 1–5. Translated by A. F. Hort, 1916. Loeb Classical Library. ISBN 0-674-99077-3 Vol 1 – Vol 2
- Enquiry into Plants: Books 6–9; Treatise on Odours; Concerning Weather Signs. Translated by A. F. Hort, 1926. Loeb Classical Library. ISBN 0-674-99088-9
  - Theophrastus (1916) [4th century BC]. Hort, Arthur (ed.). Περὶ φυτῶν ἱστορία: (Περὶ ὀσμῶν; De Odoribus) [Enquiry into Plants: Concerning odours]. Loeb Classical Library. Vol. II. London and New York: William Heinemann and G.P. Putnam's Sons. pp. 324–489. ISBN 978-0-674-99077-7. (also available here on Penelope)
- Recherches sur les plantes. Translated to French by Suzanne Amigues. Paris, Les Belles Lettres. 1988–2006. 5 tomes. Tome 1, Livres I-II. 1988. LVIII-146 p. Tome II, Livres III-IV. 1989. 306 p. Tome III, Livres V-VI. 1993. 212 p. Tome IV, Livres VII-VIII, 2003. 238 p. Tome V, Livres IX. 2006. LXX-400 p. First edition in French. Identifications are up-to-date, and carefully checked with botanists. Greek names with identifications are on Pl@ntUse.
- De Causis Plantarum. Translated by B. Einarson and G. Link, 1989–1990. Loeb Classical Library. 3 volumes: ISBN 0-674-99519-8, ISBN 0-674-99523-6, ISBN 0-674-99524-4.
- On Characters (in Greek)
  - Translated by R. C. Jebb, 1870.
  - Translated by J. M. Edmonds, 1929, with parallel text.
  - Translated by J. Rusten, 2003. Loeb Classical Library. ISBN 0-674-99603-8
- On Sweat, On Dizziness and On Fatigue. Translated by W. Fortenbaugh, R. Sharples, M. Sollenberger. Brill 2002. ISBN 90-04-12890-5
- On Weather Signs.
  - Translated by J. G. Wood, G. J. Symons, 1894.
  - Edited by Sider David and Brunschön Carl Wolfram. Brill 2007.
- On Stones

=== Modern editions ===
- Theophrastus' Characters: An Ancient Take on Bad Behavior by James Romm (author), Pamela Mensch (translator), and André Carrilho (illustrator), Callaway Arts & Entertainment, 2018.

==== Brill ====
The International Theophrastus Project started by Brill Publishers in 1992.

- 1. Theophrastus of Eresus: Sources for His Life, Writings, Thought and Influence (two volumes), edited by William Fortenbaugh et al., Leiden: Brill, 1992.
  - 1.1. Life, Writings, Various Reports, Logic, Physics, Metaphysics, Theology, Mathematics [Texts 1–264].
  - 1.2. Psychology, Human Physiology, Living Creatures, Botany, Ethics, Religion, Politics, Rhetoric and Poetics, Music, Miscellanea [Texts 265–741].
- ff. 9 volumes are planned; the published volumes are:
  - 1. Theophrastus of Eresus: Sources for His Life, Writings, Thought and Influence — Commentary, Leiden: Brill, 1994
  - 2. Logic [Texts 68–136], by Pamela Huby (2007); with contributions on the Arabic material by Dimitri Gutas.
  - 3.1. Sources on Physics (Texts 137–223), by R. W. Sharples (1998).
  - 4. Psychology (Texts 265–327), by Pamela Huby (1999); with contributions on the Arabic material by Dimitri Gutas.
  - 5. Sources on Biology (Human Physiology, Living Creatures, Botany: Texts 328–435), by R. W. Sharples (1994).
  - 6.1. Sources on Ethics [Texts 436–579B], by William W. Fortenbaugh; with contributions on the Arabic material by Dimitri Gutas (2011).
  - 8. Sources on Rhetoric and Poetics (Texts 666–713), by William W. Fortenbaugh (2005); with contributions on the Arabic material by Dimitri Gutas.
  - 9.1. Sources On Music (Texts 714-726C), by Massimo Raffa (2018).
  - 9.2. Sources on Discoveries and Beginnings, Proverbs et al. (Texts 727–741), by William W. Fortenbaugh (2014).

== General and cited references ==
- Cuvier, Georges (1830). "Lecture Ninth – Theophrastus". Baron Cuvier's Lectures on the History of the Natural Sciences. Vol. 9. Edinburgh New Philosophical Journal. pp. 76–83.
- Dorandi, Tiziano (1999). "Chapter 2: Chronology". In Algra, Keimpe; et al. (eds.). The Cambridge History of Hellenistic Philosophy. Cambridge: Cambridge University Press. pp. 52–53. ISBN 978-0-521-25028-3.
- Dwyer, Eugene (September 1993). "André Thevet and Fulvio Orsini: The Beginnings of the Modern Tradition of Classical Portrait Iconography". The Art Bulletin. 75 (3): 467–480. doi:10.2307/3045969. JSTOR 3045969.
- "Theophrastus". Encyclopedia of classical philosophy. Greenwood. 1997. p. 552.
- Filonik, Jakub (2013). "Athenian impiety trials: a reappraisal". Dike. 16: 73–74. doi:10.13130/1128-8221/4290. ISSN 1128-8221.
- Gould, Josiah B. (1970). The Philosophy of Chrysippus: Peasants, Provincials, and Folklore in the 1937 Paris World's Fair. Suny Press. p. 24. ISBN 978-0-87395-064-0.
- Gould, Josiah (1970b). The Philosophy of Chrysippus – Two Traditional Characterizations. Brill Archive. p. 25.
- Grene, Marjorie; Depew, David (2004). The philosophy of biology: an episodic history. Cambridge University Press. p. 11. ISBN 978-0-521-64380-1.
- Healy, John F. (1999). Pliny the Elder on Science and Technology. Oxford University Press. pp. 17–7.
- Laërtius, Diogenes. "The Peripatetics: Theophrastus" . Lives of the Eminent Philosophers. Vol. 1:5. Translated by Hicks, Robert Drew (Two volume ed.). Loeb Classical Library. § 36–50.
- Lang, Sidney B. (August 2005). "Pyroelectricity: From Ancient Curiosity to Modern Imaging Tool". Physics Today. 58 (8): 31–36. Bibcode:2005PhT....58h..31L. doi:10.1063/1.2062916. S2CID 121945811.
- Long, George, ed. (1842). "Theophrastus". Penny cyclopaedia of the Society for the Diffusion of Useful Knowledge. Vol. 24. pp. 332–334.
- Orsini, Fulvio (1569). Imagines et elogia virorum illustrium. Rome.
- Walton, S. A. (October 2001). "Theophrastus on Lyngurium: medieval and early modern lore from the classical lapidary tradition". Annals of Science. 58 (4): 357–379. doi:10.1080/000337900110041371. PMID 11724065. S2CID 8649133.
- Witztum, A.; Negbi, M. (1991). "Primary Xylem of Scilla hyacinthoides (Liliaceae): The Wool-Bearing Bulb of Theophrastus". Economic Botany. 45 (1): 97–102. Bibcode:1991EcBot..45...97W. doi:10.1007/BF02860053. JSTOR 4255312. S2CID 35267741.
- Negbi, Moshe (May 1989). "Theophrastus on geophytes". Botanical Journal of the Linnean Society. 100 (1): 15–43. doi:10.1111/j.1095-8339.1989.tb01708.x.

Attribution:
