= Impressions of Theophrastus Such =

1879 work of fiction by George Eliot

- Author: George Eliot
- Language: English
- Published: 1879
- Publisher: William Blackwood and Sons
- Publication place: United Kingdom
- Media type: Print (hardback & paperback)

Impressions of Theophrastus Such is a work of fiction by George Eliot (Marian Evans), first published in 1879. It was Eliot's last published writing and her most experimental, taking the form of a series of literary essays by an imaginary minor scholar whose eccentric character is revealed through his work. In a series of eighteen sometimes satirical character studies, Theophrastus Such focuses on various types of people he has observed in society. Usually, Theophrastus Such acts as a first-person narrator, but at several points, the voice of Theophrastus Such is lost or becomes confused with Eliot's omniscient perspective. Some readers have identified biographical similarities between Eliot herself and the upbringing and temperament Theophrastus Such claims as his own. In her letters, George Eliot describes herself using many of the same terms.

== Plot/Chapters ==
Ch. I "Looking Inward": Theophrastus Such introduces himself and states his purpose and the circumstances leading up to writing this book. He also tells the readers to be prepared for writings of confession as well as performance, and that the readers will have to work to understand the allusions and accounts of his character before judging the work.

Ch. II "Looking Backward": Discusses Theophrastus Such's boyhood in the Midlands, containing some memories of George Eliot's own childhood in Warwickshire.

Ch. III "How We Encourage Research": A devastating and (stiff upper lip) hilarious account of the way one titan of science obliterates the career of a young challenger in order to defend his turf, before quietly stealing his idea and publishing it as his own. Theophrastus Such describes Proteus Merman and his attempt to join a circle of the educated. Proteus Merman's exclusion and inability to join the group is highlighted by the contrasting of Proteus' last name with those of the other members. As a "merman," Proteus is doomed to be an onlooker of this community, all of whom are named after cetaceans (Narwhale, Grampus, etc . . .). In addition, Proteus Merman and his wife, Julia, share similarities with characters from Middlemarch, Casaubon and Dorothea, whose relationship can be compared with the relationship between George Eliot and her lover, George Henry Lewes. Eliot denied George Henry Lewes was the model for Causabon; however, significant aspects of the character match with Lewes's experience as a man of science, including his response to criticism in "determin[ing] to prove his own theories scientifically infallible," his status as an "unfulfilled researcher," and his lack of success in garnering respect and acknowledgement with his research, which also applies to Proteus Merman. Like Dorothea and Marian Evans, Julia is a devoted wife. Her marriage, similar to Dorothea's with Causabon, is poisoned by her husband's disappointment as he "gradually becomes rancorous and suspicious". Both situations display how single-minded focus puts a strain on relationships and how a certain flexibility of mind and attention is healthy and something to be grateful for.

Ch. IV "A Man Surprised at His Originality": A written eulogy of Lentulus, a man who critiqued the writing of others and boasted of the perfect verse he would soon write and never did, another echo of Eliot's Edward Casaubon.

Ch. V "A Too Deferential Man": Theophrastus Such describes Hinze, who has no goal for himself in mind whatsoever.

Ch. VI "Only Temper": This chapter is about the angry temperament of Touchwood. Such condemns Touchwood for his behavior, contending that a usually good and benevolent personality cannot make up for poor conduct.

Ch. VII "A Political Molecule": Cotton manufacturer Spike alliances with businessmen for his own profit, though his actions are for the benefit of the group.

Ch. VIII "The Watch-dog of Knowledge": Theophrastus Such speaks of Mordax and attempts to vindicate him.

Ch. IX "A Half-breed": Inspired by George Eliot's experience with Evangelicalism in Nuneaton and continuing the theme of the lives of clergymen in The Scenes of Clerical Life, this chapter follows Mixtus, a man formerly of religious and reforming inclination until he moved to London, married, and became a man hunting after wealth.

Ch. X "Debasing the Moral Currency": Theophrastus Such expresses his worry over the breakdown of civilization, referencing classical texts and acts of violence that occurred in the 1800s.

Ch. XI "The Wasp Credited with the Honeycomb": Theophrastus Such mocks communism and the concept that there is a definitive origin for ideas. It is a retelling of Aesop's "The Worker Bee, the Drone, and the Wasp."

Ch. XII "So Young!": A man called Ganymede has not released the image of himself he had held as a child. Then, he had been told how young and girlishly pretty he was, and he still acts as if those descriptions apply.

Ch. XIII "How We Come to Give Ourselves False Testimonials and Believe in Them": The chapter explores the importance of accurate representation. This includes facing what we have become inwardly as well as outwardly.

Ch. XIV "The Too Ready Writer": Pepin wishes to write a romance encapsulating a time (ancient Rome and other past ages) but without writing of the common element. He writes historical fiction without accuracy, not worthily representing the times, an error Eliot consciously avoided in her writing of her historical novel, Romola.

Ch. XV "Diseases of Small Authorship": Theophrastus Such analyzes an egotistical female writer called Vorticella (Vorticellae are one-celled, parasitic organisms). Her life is described as if seen through a microscope, interacting with other small organisms.

Ch. XVI "Moral Swindlers": Mine-owner Gavial Mantrap, first described as a moral man, swindles verbally and financially. A message from this chapter is a man who is kind to his family but wrongfully uses their political and financial ability cannot be called moral, and that those holding great skill with words have even more responsibility to use them carefully with consideration to their moral impact.

Ch. XVII, "Shadows of the Coming Race": This chapter represents a discussion between Theophrastus Such and his friend Trost, a man with great interest in technology, about the future and the use of machines. Theophrastus Such believes machines will come to a point where they can supersede men.

Ch. XVIII, "The Modern Hep! Hep! Hep!": Theophrastus Such turn introspective, comparing himself and the exile he felt described in Ch. II "Looking Backwards" with the history of the Jews.

== Characters ==
Source: (Note: Most of the content in the characters section has been taken directly from the dictionary by Isadora Mudge and Minnie Sears but there are some additions which will be marked by an asterisk at the beginning and end of the affixed phrase or word.)

- Acer: *A man who critiques Mordax's sense of justice and benevolence.*
- Adrastus: A busy essayist who writes on many subjects.
- Aliquis: "Who lets no attack on himself pass unnoticed."
- Mr. Apollos: "The eloquent Congregational preacher who had studied in Germany and had advanced liberal views.
- Aquila: A conversational bird of prey who instinctively appropriates from others morsels of information to use in his brilliant conversations.
- Avis: A man giving to "saccharine excesses."
- Bantam: A small, feebly crowing individual who attempts to correct the brilliant Aquila.
- Sir Hong Kong Bantam: One of Mixtus's fashionable acquaintances.
- Mr. Barabbas: A swindler whose morals are such a contrast to those of that excellent family man, Sir Gavial Mantrap.
- Bombus: A loud buzzing, bouncing writer.
- Bovis: A gentleman who is horrified at the saccharine excesses of Avis, not realizing that he himself takes twenty-six lumps of sugar each day.
- Mrs. Bovis: Mr. Bovis's watchful wife, who counts his lumps of sugar.
- Bruin: An epicure who found and tasted a honeycomb.
- Butzkopf: A German scholar.
- Monsieur Cachalot: A French scholar, who comments on the Merman-Grampus dispute.
- Callista: An imaginative person, who frequently gives false testimonials.
- S. Catulus: A younger member of Shark's remarkable family.
- Corvus: An inconsistent person who takes a mild view of Mordax's fierceness when it is directed against someone else.
- Crispi: An artist, one of Scintilla's fashionable circle.
- Columba: *Believes Reverend Merula wrote "Vestiges."*
- Dugong: A German scholar.
- Euphorion: A plagiarist who freely acknowledges the source of his ideas when the citation of great names of the past will show his scholarship, but who passes off other borrowings as his own, and "is disposed to treat the distinction between mine and thine in original authorship as egoistic, narrowing, and low".
- Felicia: A clever woman whose opinions are eagerly sought by Mr. Hintze, the too deferential man.
- Mr. Fugleman: A critic whose recent remarks about the Iliad Mr. Hintze cites.
- Ganymede: An old-young writer, "once a girlishly handsome and precocious youth" who had produced a "Comparative estimate of European nations" before he was well out of his teens and continues to regard himself as wonderfully young when he is fat and middle-aged.
- Greenland Grampus: A great authority, author of an epoch-making book, whose theory about the Magicodumbras and the Zuzumotzis Proteus Merman discovers to be wrong.
- Gregarina: A lady "whose distinction was that she had had cholera and who did not feel herself in her true position with strangers until they knew it."
- Hautboy: Quoted by Hintze, the too deferential man, as regarding Chaucer as a poet of the first order.
- Heloisa: A lady who disapproves of Laura's attempts to disguise her age.
- Hinze: "The too deferential man." "He is the superlatively deferential man, and walks about with murmured wonder at the wisdom and discernment of everybody who talks to him. He cultivates the low toned tete-a-tete, keeping his hat carefully in his hand and often stroking it, while he smiles with downcast eyes as if to relieve his feelings under the pressure of the remarkable conversation which it is his honour to enjoy."
- Hoopoe, of John's: A critic who thinks that Toucan of Magdalen is the author of a certain work.
- Mr. Johns: A Baptist minister with a solemn twang.
- Laniger: A man with "a temper but no talent for repartee", who is persuaded that his harsh critic Mordax is a wolf at heart.
- Laura: A lady disapproved of by Heloisa because she disguises her age.
- Lentulus: A conceited man, "surprised at his own originality," who is reserved in praising his contemporaries because he sees how superior his own work on the same lines would have been if he had ever taken it up.
- Lippus: A blunderer, who ruins his chance by a too elaborate personal canvas.
- Loligo: A fluent writer, in the great Merman-Grampus controversy.
- Sir Gavial Mantrap: A swindler who is excused and pitied by some, because he has such good morals.
- Megalosaurus: "Greatest of fossils," *part of the educated community Proteus Merman wishes to join.*
- Melissa: A sentimental lady who pities the swindler, Sir Gavial Mantrap, because he "is an excellent family man."
- Julia Merman: Proteus Merman's devoted wife, who is involved in his misfortunes.
- Proteus Merman: A young man of promise who discovers an error in the epoch-making work of Grampus; he is ruined by the resulting controversy, while Grampus annexes his idea and takes all the credit for himself.
- Microps: A "Cetacean of unanswerable authority," *part of the educated community Proteus Merman wishes to join.*
- Mixtus: A "half-breed"; a successful businessman who has gained great wealth but finds the spiritual and intellectual interests and ideals of his youth submerged in the society which his lively and worldly wife collects around her.
- Monas: The author of a single book, entitled Here and There, or A Trip from Truro and Transylvania.
- Mordax: "The watch-dog of knowledge," an intellectual worker who is admirable and kindly in his personal relations, but a biting critic and fierce antagonist if he is corrected or his opinions challenged.
- Lord Narwhal: Grampus's friend.
- Pepin: The too ready writer; a busy "general writer" who feels a "certain surprise that there have not been more persons equal to himself."
- M. Porpesse: A French savant who takes notice of the great Merman-Grampus controversy.
- "Pulpit" (Real): Theophrastus Such's valet and factotum, "an excellent respectable servant whose spelling is unvitiated by non-phonetic superfluities: and who is never surprised.
- Scintilla: Mixtus's worldly wife, a lively lady who knows nothing of Nonconformists except that they are unfashionable, and who cuts her husband off from his old friends and ideals.
- Shrike: *Believes Buzzard wrote "Vestiges."*
- Skunk: *Theophrastus Such believes he wrote "Vestiges."*
- Spike: "A political molecule" who voted on the side of Progress though he was not inwardly attached to it under that name.
- Reverend Mr. Such: Theophrastus Such's father, a country clergyman in the Midlands. "My father was nonetheless beloved because he was understood to be of a saving disposition. . . . The sight of him was not un welcome at any door, and he was remarkable among the clergy of his district for having no lasting feud with rich or poor in his parish . . . He was apithy talker, and his sermons bore marks of his own composition.
- Theophrastus Such: An eccentric observer and humorist who analyses and comments upon the various types of people whom he meets in the "Nation of London". "Yet I am a bachelor, and the person I love best has never loved me, or known that I loved her. Though continually in society, and caring about the joys and sorrows of my neighbours, I feel myself, so far as my personal lot is concerned, uncared for and alone . . . Why should I expect to be admired ... I have done no services to my country beyond those of every peaceable orderly citizen; and as to intellectual contribution, my only published work was a failure so that I am spoken of to inquiring beholders as 'the author of a book you have probably not seen' . . . Then in some quarters my awkward feet are against me, the length of my upper lip, and an inveterate way I have of walking with my head foremost and my chin projecting."
- Theron: A painstaking student whose condensed exposition is excluded to leave space for the copious brew of Adrastus, the too-ready writer.
- Toucan, of Magdalen: *The Hoopoes of John's believes this person was the author of "Vestiges."*
- Touchwood: A bad-tempered man. "He is by turns insolent, quarrelsome, repulsively haughty to innocent people who approach him with respect, neglectful of his friends, angry in face of legitimate demands, procrastinating in the fulfilment of such demands, prompted to rude words and harsh looks by a moody disgust with his fellow men in general—and yet, as everybody will assure you, the s0ul of honour, a steadfast friend, a defender of the oppressed, an affectionate hearted creature."
- Trost: An optimist who believes that at some future period this will be the best of all possible worlds, and who does not agree with Theophrastus Such about the future of the human race.
- Tulpian: A gentleman with considerable interest at his disposal to whom Hinze, the too deferential man, frequently speaks.
- Ubique: A public speaker who is criticized by Seemper for the very faults which Semper possesses.
- Vibrio: The critic who writes in the Medley Pie praising Vorticella's book.
- Volvox: The critic of the Monitor, who, according to Vorticella, contradicts himself in his review of her book.
- Vorticella: "A portly lady walking in silk attire," the author of a book entitled The Channel Islands, with Notes and an Appendix, which she allows no one to forget.
- Scrag Whale: An explorer; a Cetacean of unanswerable authority, whom Mr. Merman discovers to be at issue with Grampus.
- Professor Sperm N. Wale: A distinguished Cetacean from whose spirited article in an American newspaper Grampus first learns of Mr. Merman's book.
- Ziphius: A Cetacean of unanswerable authority, whom Mr. Merman finds to be at issue with the great Grampus.

== Critical reception ==
Contemporary reviews

At the time of Impressions of Theophrastus Such's publication, the audience of George Eliot had not been expecting another work from her pen until she had finished her late husband's (George Henry Lewes) literary project. Though many reviews expressed their initial excitement for the book, they also expressed their disappointment. The Sheffield Daily Telegraph compared the work to "those numerous preliminary sketches which a painter makes in the course of elaborating a great picture." The Chicago Daily Tribune likewise saw Impressions of Theophrastus Such as the possible groundwork for another of George Eliot's novels, never to be fully realized. This reviewer notes the similarities between the essays in Impressions of Theophrastus Such with excerpts scattered throughout George Eliot's works. Many of the reviews acknowledge the writing within Impressions of Theophrastus Such to be clever but its long-windedness and inability to evoke an emotional response renders little enjoyment for the readers. The London Echo, The Standard, and The Pall Mall Gazette comment upon the last chapter of Impressions of Theophrastus Such (Ch. XVIII "The Modern Hep! Hep! Hep!), discussing George Eliot's novel Daniel Deronda and how the author presents Jews within her works. The Pall Mall Gazette believed this chapter to be the only section harkening back to the skill and style displayed in George Eliot's celebrated works. The Standard believed Theophrastus Such showed brilliance in its satirical and humorous hints but lacked depth, giving off an ephemeral air and distancing readers from the book's characters.

Current scholarship

Impressions of Theophrastus Such is not one of George Eliot's most studied works, as many researchers focus on her novels, but there have been a few essays discussing the significance and symbolism contained within the series of literary essays.

Emily Butler-Probst's essay, "They Read with Their Own Eye from Nature's Own Book: Imagining Whales in Impressions of Theophrastus Such" (2021), focuses on the chapter concerning Proteus Merman (Ch. III "How We Encourage Research"), where a group of academics refuse to acknowledge Merman's theories because he is not one of them. Butler-Probst builds on many of the connections between George Henry Lewes and Proteus Merman from Dr. Beverley Park Rilett's 2016 article "George Henry Lewes, the Real Man of Science Behind George Eliot's Fictional Pedants," which is referenced in the summary on Ch. III, though Butler-Probst's article goes on to highlight Lewes's influences beyond character inspiration to include Eliot's allusions to Lewes's Seaside Studies content.

Scott C. Thompson, in his 2018 essay, "Subjective Realism and Diligent Imagination: G.H. Lewes's Theory of Psychology and George Eliot's Impressions of Theophrastus Such," speaks of the progression of George Eliot's realism in her novels, from the perceptive observations in her early works to the complex social groups built into her later writings. Though it does have a cast of characters acting out scenes and exchanging dialogue, Impression of Theophrastus Such does not tell a story, as did her novels. Thompson especially points out George Eliot's deviation in her decision to write her last work in first-person rather than the third-person narrator of her novels and how this changed her usual characters from "fully realized and psychologically complex" to "typified [and] one-dimensional".

Another recent article, "George Eliot's Last Stand: Impressions of Theophrastus Such" (2016) by Rosemarie Bodenheimer explores how contemporary readers felt about the change in style, and explores whether Impressions of Theophrastus Such is meant to be read as a fictional narrative fiction. She also delineates the significance and views of Theophrastus Such as the narrator. According to Bodenheimer, readers felt betrayed by the change of tune in George Eliot's works; along with several other recent scholars, Bodenheimer argues for reading Impressions of Theophrastus Such as a work of fiction, noting that Theophrastus is a "self-reflexive fictional character whose failings and contradictions are the real subject of the book". The book was written in the form of reflexive essays, but it is still fiction because the people and events Theophrastus Such observes are imagined.

== Bibliography ==
- Bodenheimer, Rosemarie. "George Eliot's Last Stand: Impressions of Theophrastus Such." 'Victorian Literature and Culture', vol. 44, no. 3, 2016, pp. 607–621., doi:10.1017/S1060150316000036.
- Butler-Probst, Emily. "They Read With Their Own Eye from Nature's Own Book': Imagining Whales in Impressions of Theophrastus Such." 'George Eliot Scholars', 2020.
- Henry, Nancy. Introduction. Impressions of Theophrastus Such, by George Eliot, 1879, volume 1, University of Iowa Press, pp. vii-xxxvii.
- "The Impressions of Theophrastus Such." London Echo, 21 Aug. 1879, p. 4.
- Mudge, Isadore Gilbert and Minnie Earl Sears. A George Eliot Dictionary: The Characters and Scenes of the Novels, Stories, and Poems Alphabetically Arranged. London, George

Routledge and Sons, 1924.

- "Reviews." Sheffield Daily Telegraph, 12 June 1879, p. 8.
- Rilett, Beverley Park, "George Henry Lewes, the Real Man of Science Behind George Eliot's Fictional Pedants." George Eliot Scholars, 2016.
- "Theophrastus Such." Chicago Daily Tribune, 21 June 1879.
- "Theophrastus Such." Pall Mall Gazette, 2 July 1879, p. 12.
- "Theophrastus Such." Standard, 17 June 1879, p. 2.
- Thompson, Scott C. "Subjective Realism and Diligent Imagination: G.H. Lewes's Theory of Psychology and George Eliot's Impressions of Theophrastus Such." 'Victorian Review', vol. 44 no. 2, 2018, p. 197-214. 'Project MUSE', doi:10.1353/vcr.2019.0016.
