= Jacinth =

Yellow-red to red-brown gem-quality variety of zircon

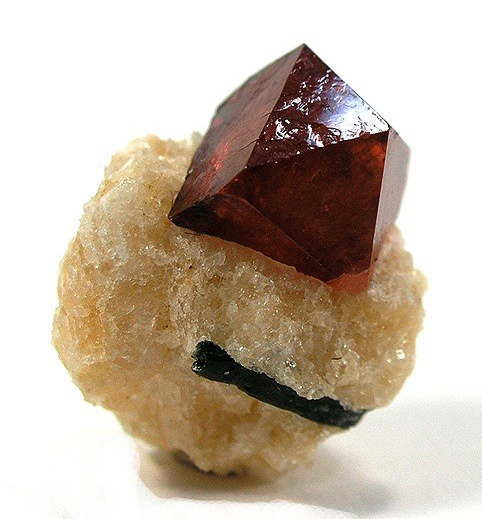
Red zircon from Gilgit, Pakistan

Jacinth (/ˈdʒæsɪnθ/, /ˈdʒeɪsɪnθ/) or hyacinth (/ˈhaɪ.əsɪnθ/) is a yellow-red to red-brown variety of zircon used as a gemstone.

In Exodus 28:19, one of the precious stones set into the hoshen (the breastplate worn by the High Priest of Israel) is called, in Hebrew, leshem, which has often been translated into English as "jacinth". The modern identification of leshem with jacinth seems to have been popularized by Martin Luther.

In Revelation 21:20, one of the foundation stones of the New Jerusalem is hyacinth (Greek: hyakinthos). However, Strong's Concordance and Thayer's Greek Lexicon describe this as a stone of the color of the hyacinth plant, i.e. dark blue. Therefore, the stone intended may be the sapphire. In Revelation 9:17, the word appears in adjective form (hyakinthinous, "hyacinthine"); this, again, is thought to be descriptive of a blue or purple color, with no reference to the modern jacinth stone.
