= Lapidary (text) =

Treatise on the properties of stones

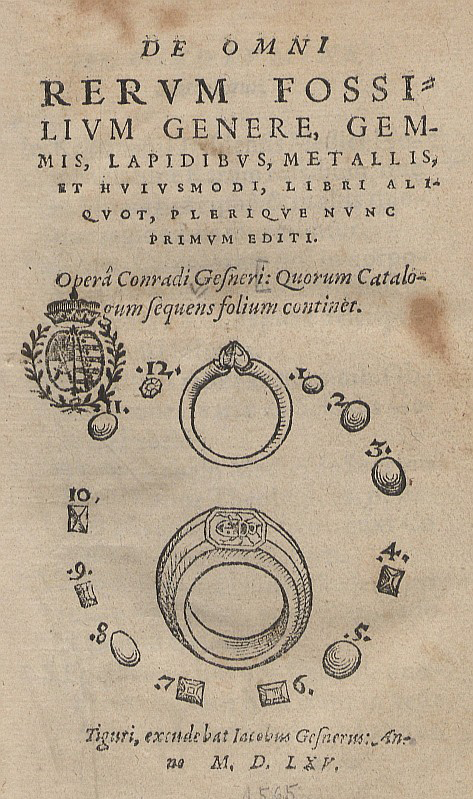
Title page of a printed lapidary by Conrad Gessner of 1565

A lapidary is a text in verse or prose, often a whole book, that describes the physical properties and metaphysical virtues of precious and semi-precious stones, that is to say, a work on gemology. It was frequently used as a medical textbook, since it also includes practical information about the supposed medical application of each stone. Several lapidaries also provide information about the countries or regions where some rocks were thought to originate, and others speculate about the natural forces in control of their formation.

Lapidaries were very popular in the Middle Ages, when belief in gems' inherent power for various purposes was widely held. Among the wealthy, collecting jewels was often an obsession and a popular way to store and transport capital. In the Middle Ages, scholars often distinguish three different kinds of lapidaries:

1. the scientific lapidary,
2. the magical or astrological lapidary that sets the relationship between the Signs of the Zodiac and a particular gemstone, and
3. the Christian lapidary, which describes the symbolism of gems mentioned in the bible,

although contemporary readers would have regarded both the first two categories as representing scientific treatments.

Lapidaries are often found in conjunction with herbals, and as part of larger encyclopedic works. Belief in the powers of particular types of jewel to achieve effects such as protecting the wearer against diseases or other kinds of harm was strong in the Middle Ages, and explanations of these formed much of the material in lapidaries.

The medieval world had little systematic geological knowledge, and found it difficult to distinguish between many stones with similar colors or to recognise the same stone found in a variety of colors.

The objects regarded as "stones" in the classical, medieval Renaissance periods included many substances now classified as metallic compounds, such as cinnabar, hematite, calamine, and organic or fossil substances including pearl, coral, amber, and the mythical lyngurium.

There were traditions of lapidary texts outside Europe, in the Islamic world as well as East Asia. The Chinese tradition was for long essentially concerned with the aesthetic qualities of stones, but by the later Middle Ages was influenced by the classical Western tradition, as transmitted through Islamic texts.

== Surviving and lost texts ==
The tradition goes back to ancient Mesopotamia with books like Abnu šikinšu. Theophrastus (died c. 287 BC) treated rocks and other minerals as well as gems, and remained a significant indirect source for the scientific tradition; he was all but unknown in Europe in the Middle Ages, and not translated into Latin until the 15th century. He attempted to fill out with specifics the general remarks on minerals of Aristotle, and took an approach more compatible with modern concepts of mineralogy than any other writer of a full-length treatise on the subject until Georgius Agricola in the 16th century, widely recognised as the "father" of modern mineralogy. Both concentrated on the appearance of a wide range of minerals, where they came from, and how they were extracted and used. While Pliny and others wrote on how to detect fake or imitation gems, some, like Jean d'Outremeuse (d. 1400), described how to make them in coloured glass, which by the Late Middle Ages was recommended for use in church metalwork.

Most classical lapidaries are lost; of the 38 works listed by Pliny (in Book XXXVII), only Theophrastus' text survives. There are hundreds of different medieval texts, but most are mainly based on several works that were redacted, translated and adapted in various ways to suit the individual manuscript's needs. The oldest of these sources was Pliny the Elder's Natural History from the 1st century AD, Book 37 of which covered gems, drawing on Theophrastus and other classical predecessors. Solinus was another ancient source, and Isidore of Seville an early medieval one. Later works, which also drew on Arabic sources (Avicenna's work was available in Latin), included the verse De Gemmis (or De Lapidibus) by Bishop Marbode of Rennes (d. 1123), the most popular late medieval lapidary, describing 60 stones, and works by Arnold of Saxony, Vincent of Beauvais and that traditionally attributed (probably wrongly) to Albertus Magnus. Versions of Marbode's work were translated into eight languages, including Hebrew and Irish, and 33 manuscripts survive of the English version alone.

== Gem properties ==
Medieval or early modern lapidaries describe particular gemstones' protective and healing properties, including diamond, emerald, sapphire, amethyst, ruby, etc. Some of the stones mentioned are metals or metallic compounds such as cinnabar, hematite, calamine, and magnetite. Numerous plant-based and animal products like coral and pearl were also included in this category, comprising amber and toadstone as fossilized substances.

Carrying a diamond was recommended to keep limbs healthy, heal lunatics, and act as a shield from the dangers of wild animals and their poison. Several works suggest diamonds and corals effectively drive away evil dreams, wicked spirits, and demons. Early modern lapidaries recommended that sapphire would lose splendor and emeralds would break if touched by an adulterer's skin. According to the legend, emeralds were used to protect from evil spirits and were good against poison. Sapphire was the "fairest of all precious stones", and was used to block cholera, to remove ulcers in the intestines, and to prevent poisoning. It was also believed that it could recreate the heart and help in cardiac pressure. Amethyst was used to avoid drunkenness, and this idea was one of the common stone attributes accepted during the Middle Ages. Furthermore, a ruby known as the "Black Prince" and coral were valuable gemstones that could reveal danger or illness. For instance, a ruby worn as an amulet would "keep the body in safety, and that if any danger is towards it, it will grow black and obscure." On the other side, a coral "contract ungrateful spots, if the possessor of it is dangerously sick." Coral also had a very significant medicinal function: the ability to protect newborn children. Giving the infant ten grains of the coral powder mixed with the mother's milk before they have tasted anything would preserve the newborn from epilepsy in the future. Apothecaries also suggested coral be ground and diluted in water as a remedy for melancholy.

Pearl, coral, and amber were in the category "Belonging to the Sea", which had a connection with gynecological issues. The pearl was an incredible invention of nature and was considered a symbol of nature's perfection and purity. It was valued for its medicinal properties in preventing heart failure and treating fertility issues. Some lapidaries state that pearls and corals were vital in purifying the blood in the body. Physicians believed that amber helped heal or release the symptoms in violent coughs and the spitting of blood.

The Lapidary De Materia Medica provided descriptions of the medicinal applications of hematite and calamine. For example, hematite effectively treated afflictions of the eye, scabs, and mother's milk production. Calamine was related to the healing of ulcers by applying it as an external plaster.

As in other areas, the medieval scholarship was highly conservative. Theophrastus had described lyngurium, a gemstone supposedly formed of the solidified urine of the lynx (the best ones coming from wild males), which was included in "almost every medieval lapidary" until it gradually disappeared from view in the 17th century.

=== Medicine ===
Just as drugs derived from plants were and are important in medicine, it seemed natural to the ancient and medieval mind that minerals also had medical properties (and indeed many mineral-derived chemicals are still in medical use). Saint Thomas Aquinas, the dominant theologian of the Late Middle Ages, propounded the view that the whole of the natural world had ultimately been created by God for the benefit of man, leading medieval Christians to expect to find beneficial uses for all materials.

Lapidaries portrayed "the most common method of medical application" being wearing the stone on one's person in a jewelry setting, for example, in a ring or a necklace or held the stone against the skin. Allowing direct contact between the gem and the skin was encouraged to facilitate the transfer of healing properties.

Other forms of application included ointments containing ground stones or taking the stone internally in ground form, often as part of a cocktail of several different herbal, mineral, and other ingredients; this seems to have become especially often mentioned in the 16th and 17th centuries. Taking a certain amount of grains of the powder stone and mixed with water was another application method. References in Theophrastus work in lapidaries about the medicinal use of stones mentions that smaragus (emerald) is good for the eyes and that by looking at it, healing effects are produced.

Stones were covered in other general medical books, ranging from the 1st century Greek De Materia Medica by Dioscurides to a wide range of Early Modern medical self-help books.

To differentiate between similar looking gemstones requires great experience as well as some sort of magnification. Some of these gems exhibit a wide range of physical attributes. For instance, ruby comes in various colors such as pinkish-mauve and pigeon-blood red; sapphires exist in pink, multiple shades of blue, and a colorless variety. Medieval and early contemporary texts had trouble sorting one gem from another. The possibility of a gem being fake or misidentified limited the stone's medical use. Practitioners and patients cited this to explain when the desired effects were not achieved using this healing method.

== Christian symbolism ==
A school of lapidaries expounded the symbolism of gems mentioned in the Bible, especially two sets of precious and semi-precious stones listed there. The first of these were the twelve jewels, in engraved gem form, on the Priestly breastplate described in the Book of Exodus (Exodus 28:15–19), and the second the twelve stones mentioned in the Book of Revelation as forming the foundation stones of the New Jerusalem (Revelation 21:18–20)—eight of these are the same (or were in the Vulgate translation). The late Anglo-Saxon Old English Lapidary took the latter group as its subject. The symbolism of these sets had been explored by theologians since Saints Jerome and Augustine. Various other schemes were developed, linking stones to particular saints, classes of angels, and other areas of Christianity.

== Astrology ==
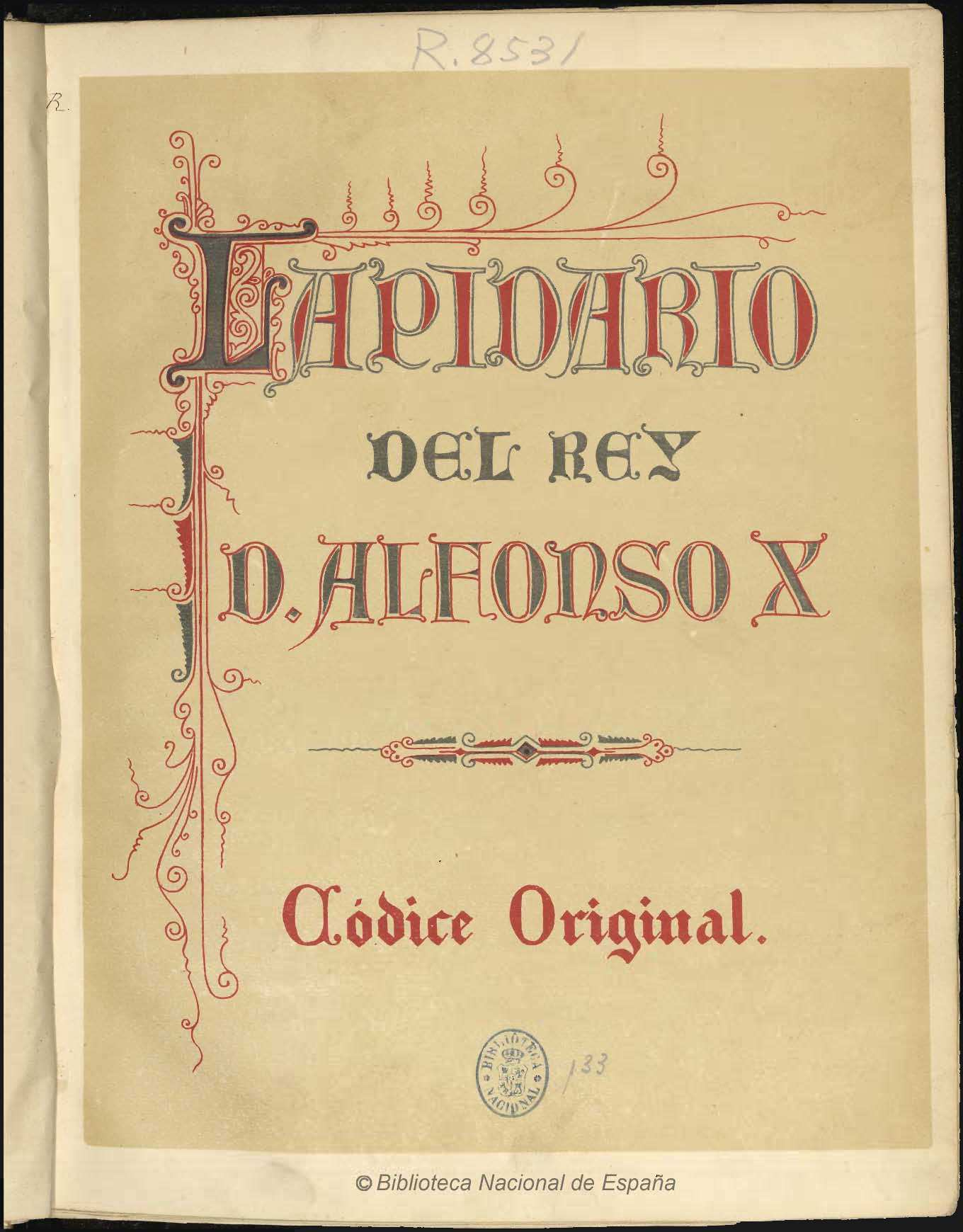
Lapidary of King D. Alfonso X

Another type of lapidary dealt with the astrological relationships and significance of gems; one of the largest was the Lapidary of Alfonso X or "Alfonso the Learned", King of Castile (r. 1252–1284), which was compiled for him by other authors, mostly Muslim. This was in several parts and set out the relationships between the Signs of the Zodiac, with each degree of each sign relating to a stone, and the astrological planets and other bodies, again related to particular stones. The strength of the medical and magical properties of stones was said to vary with the movements of the heavenly bodies that controlled them.

== Sources ==
- Cherry, John, Medieval Goldsmiths, The British Museum Press, 2011 (2nd edn.), ISBN 9780714128238
- Evans, Joan, "The 'Lapidary' of Alfonso the Learned", The Modern Language Review, Vol. 14, No. 4 (Oct., 1919), pp. 424–426, Modern Humanities Research Association, JSTOR
- Glick, Thomas F., Livesey, Steven John, Wallis, Faith, eds., "Lapidary" in Medieval Science, Technology And Medicine: An Encyclopedia, Volume 11 of The Routledge encyclopedias of the Middle Ages, 2005, Routledge, ISBN 0415969301, 9780415969307, google books
- Harris, Nichola Erin, The idea of lapidary medicine, 2009, Rutgers University, PhD dissertation (book forthcoming), available online as PDF
- Nunemaker, J. Horace, "The Madrid Manuscript of the Alfonsine Lapidaries", Modern Philology, Vol. 29, No. 1 (Aug., 1931), pp. 101–104, University of Chicago Press, JSTOR
- Riley, Denise (May 2017). "On the Lapidary Style" (PDF). differences: A Journal of Feminist Cultural Studies. 28 (1). Duke University Press: 17–36. doi:10.1215/10407391-3821676.
- Thorndike, Lynn, "Some Unpublished Minor Works Bordering on Science Written in the Late Fifteenth Century", Speculum, Vol. 39, No. 1 (Jan., 1964), pp. 85–95, Medieval Academy of America, JSTOR
- Vauchez, André, Lapidge, Michael (eds), Encyclopedia of the Middle Ages: A–J, Volume 1 of Encyclopedia of the Middle Ages, 2000, Routledge, ISBN 1579582826, 9781579582821, google books
- Walton, S.A., Theophrastus on Lyngurium: medieval and early modern lore from the classical lapidary tradition, 2001, Annals of Science, 2001 Oct;58(4):357-79, PDF on Academia.edu
- "Wheaton": "Medieval Lit Bibliography – Stones", Wheaton College, Illinois
