= List of people from Ghent =

This is a list of notable people from Ghent, who were either born in Ghent, or spent part of their life there.

== People born in Ghent ==
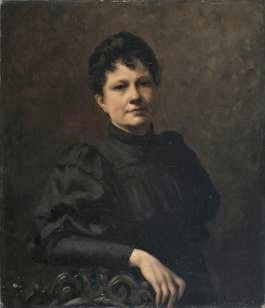
Self-portrait by Emma De Vigne

=== Before the 19th century ===
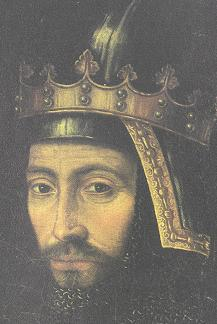
John of Gaunt

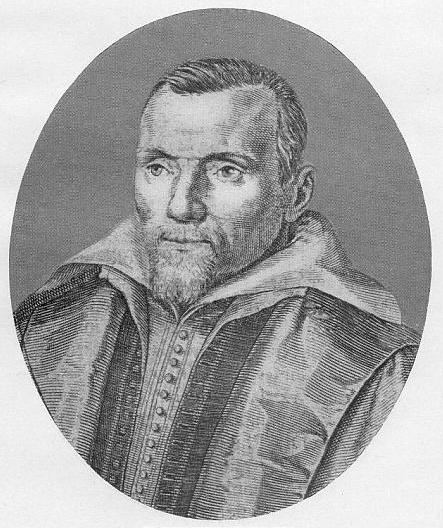
Daniel Heinsius

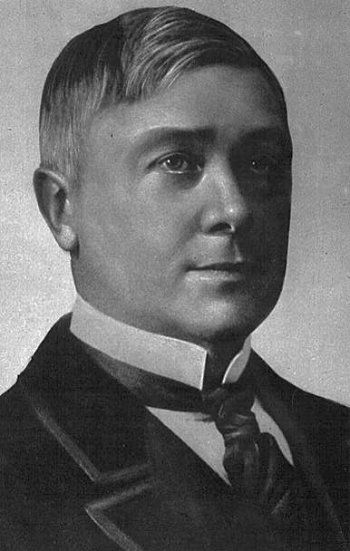
Maurice Maeterlinck

- Henry of Ghent, scholastic philosopher (c. 1217 – 1293)
- Jacob van Artevelde, statesman and political leader (c. 1290 – 1345)
- Franz Ackerman, statesman (c. 1330 – 1387)
- Philip van Artevelde, Flemish patriot (c. 1340 – 1382)
- John of Gaunt, 1st Duke of Lancaster (1340–1399)
- Hugo van der Goes, painter (c. 1440 – 1482)
- Alexander Agricola, composer of the Renaissance (1445/6 - 1506)
- Jacob Obrecht, composer of the Renaissance (c. 1457 – 1505)
- Adrianus Todeschinus, captain of the papal guard (1471–1546)
- Jacques Buus, Franco-Flemish composer and organist of the Renaissance (c. 1500 – 1565)
- Charles V, Holy Roman Emperor (‘’Charles Quint’’, 1500–1558)
- Cornelius Canis, Franco-Flemish composer of the Renaissance, music director for Charles V in the 1540–1550s
- Jan Utenhove, writer (c. 1520 – 1566)
- Lieven de Key, architect (1560–1627)
- Philippe van Lansberg, astronomer (1561–1632)
- Daniel Heinsius, scholar of the Dutch Renaissance (1580–1655)
- Jean-Baptiste Loeillet (of London), flutist, oboist, and harpsichordist (1680–1730)
- Jean-Baptiste Loeillet (of Ghent), composer (1688 – c. 1720)
- Josse Boutmy, organist and harpsichordist (1697–1779)
- Peter Anton von Verschaffelt, sculptor and architect (1710–1793)
- Lieven Bauwens, industrialist (1769–1822)

=== 19th century ===
- Josse Joseph de Lehaye, politician, (1800–1888)
- Charles Morren, Belgian botanist and horticulturist (1807-1858)
- Henri Colson, burgomaster of Ghent (1819-1900)
- Eugène Van Bemmel, author and educator (1824–1880)
- Frans de Potter, writer, (1834–1904)
- Charles John Seghers, Jesuit clergyman and missionary (1839–1886)
- Paul de Vigne, sculptor (1843–1901)
- De Vriendt brothers, painters (second half of 19th century)
- Pierre De Geyter, socialist, composer, and wood carver (1848–1932)
- Victor Horta, Art Nouveau architect (1861–1947)
- Henri Lammens, Jesuit and orientalist (1862–1937)
- Maurice Maeterlinck, poet, playwright, essayist, recipient of the Nobel Prize in Literature (1862–1949)
- Théo van Rysselberghe, neo-impressionist painter 1862–1926)
- Constant Montald, monumental and symbolic painter 1862-1944
- Brice Meuleman, Jesuit, 2nd Archbishop of Calcutta (now Kolkata) (1862–1924)
- Leo Baekeland, chemist and inventor of Bakelite (1863–1944)
- Pierre Louÿs, poet and romantic writer (1870–1925)
- Karel van de Woestijne, writer (1878–1929)
- George Van Biesbroeck, astronomer (1880–1974)
- Gustave Van de Woestijne, painter (1881–1947)
- Geo Verbanck, sculptor (1881–1961)
- Frits Van den Berghe, expressionist painter (1883–1939)
- Valerius Geerebaert, Redemptorist (1884–1957)
- Maurice Langaskens, painter (1884—1946)
- George Sarton, historian of science (1884–1956)
- Désiré Defauw, conductor and violinist (1885–1960)
- Jean Ray, writer (1887–1964)
- Richard Minne, writer and poet (1891–1965)
- Corneille Jean François Heymans, physiologist and recipient of the Nobel Prize in Physiology or Medicine (1892–1968)
- Edgard Colle, chess master (1897–1932)
- Henri Story, politician (1897–1944)
- Emma De Vigne, painter (1850-98)

=== 20th century ===
- Suzanne Lilar, playwright, essayist and novelist (1901–1992)
- Jozef Vergote, Egyptologist and coptologist (1910–1992)
- Johan Daisne, author, poet, and librarian (1912–1978)
- Théo Lefèvre, lawyer and prime minister of Belgium (1914–1973)
- Armand Pien, weatherman (1920–2003)
- Marc Sleen, comics artist and cartoonist (born 1922)
- Willy De Clercq, politician (born 1927)
- Marcel Storme, lawyer and professor at the Ghent University (born 1930)
- Jean-Marie Albert Bottequin, photographer and journalist (born 1941)
- Graba' (Ignace De Graeve), designer and artist (1940-2016)
- Jacques Rogge, former president of the IOC (born 1942)
- Gérard Mortier, musical artistic director (born 1943)
- René Jacobs, counter-tenor and conductor (born 1946)
- Philippe Herreweghe, conductor (born 1947)
- Marc Mortier, first CEO of Flanders Expo (1948–2004)
- Godfried-Willem Raes, composer, performer, and instrument maker (born 1952)
- Matthias Storme, lawyer, academic, thinker, and politician (born 1959)
- Dirk Brossé, composer, conductor
- Frank De Winne, cosmonaut (born 1961)
- Saul Akkemay (Panbello), freelance publicist and columnist (born 1964)
- Nic Balthazar, movie critic and film director (born 1964)
- Michel de Kemmeter, entrepreneur and author in the fields of Personal development and Intangible assets and Human Sustainable Development (born 1964)
- Peter Goes, children's author and illustrator
- Helmut Lotti, musician (born 1969)
- Filip Meirhaeghe, cyclist (born 1971)
- Matthew Gilmore, cyclist (born 1972)
- Freya Van den Bossche, socialist politician (born 1975)
- Cédric Van Branteghem, athlete (born 1979)
- Bradley Wiggins, British cyclist (born 1980)
- Jonas Geirnaert, creator of animation shorts (born 1982)
- Iljo Keisse, cyclist (born 1982)
- Eline Berings, athlete (born 1986)
- Vadis Odjidja-Ofoe, football player (born 1989)
- Kevin De Bruyne, professional footballer (born 1991)
- Gijs van Hoecke, cyclist (born 1991)
- Gaelle Mys, Olympic gymnast (born 1991)
- Xavier Henry, shooting guard/small forward for the NBA's Los Angeles Lakers (born 1995)
- Willy van Ryckeghem economist (born 1935)

== Lived in Ghent ==
=== Before the 19th century ===
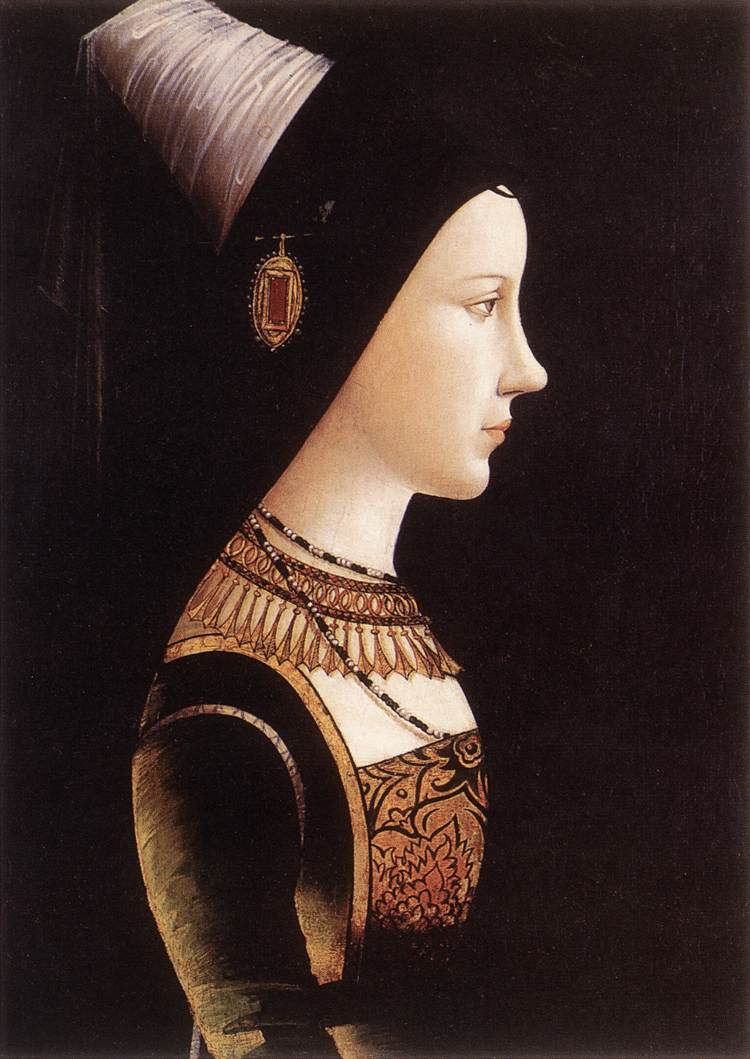
Mary of Burgundy

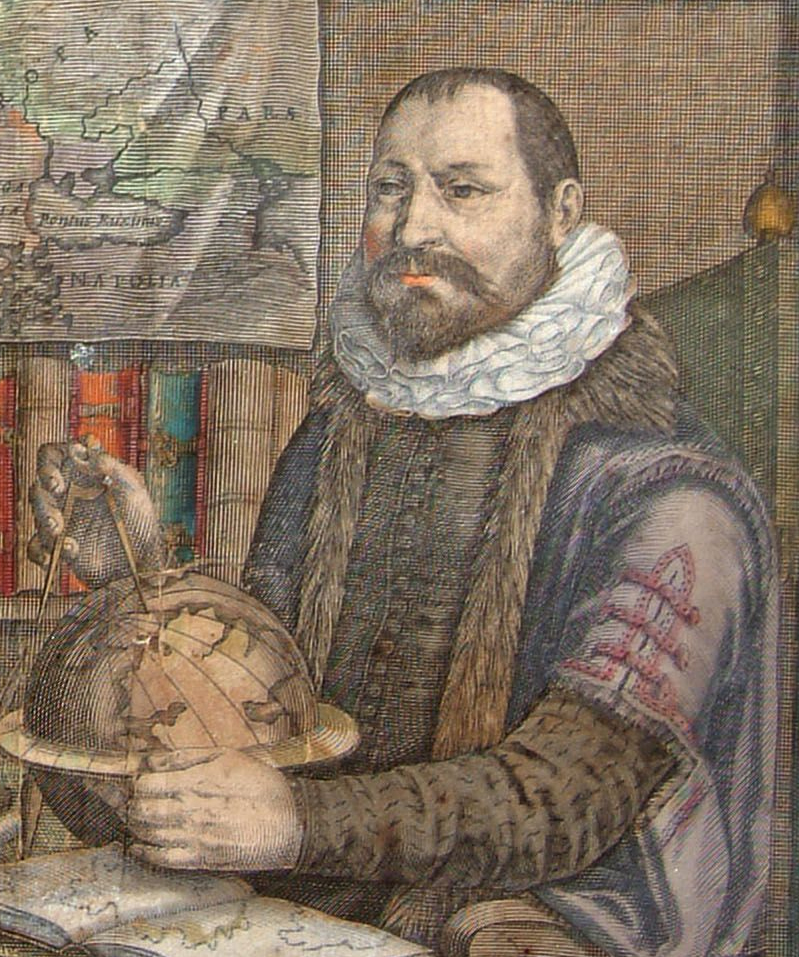
Jodocus Hondius

- Saint Amand, Roman Catholic saint (584–675)
- Saint Bavo, patron saint of Ghent (589–654)
- Jan Boeksent, Franciscan Sculptor.
- Hubert van Eyck, painter (c. 1366 – 1426)
- Jan van Eyck, painter (c. 1385 – 1441)
- Joos van Wassenhove, painter (c. 1410 – c. 1480)
- Maximilian I and Mary of Burgundy married in Ghent in 1477
- William Damasus Lindanus, Bishop of Ghent (1525–1588)
- Jodocus Hondius, artist, engraver, and cartographer (1563–1612)
- Tobie Matthew, English Catholic priest (1577–1655)
- Caspar de Crayer, painter (1582–1669)
- David 't Kindt, architect (1699–1770)
- Jan Frans Willems, writer (1793–1846)
- Jacques-Joseph Haus, criminal law and natural rights professor at Ghent University (1796–1881)

=== 19th century ===
- Joseph Plateau, physicist, taught at the Ghent University (1801–1883)
- Louis XVIII of France was exiled in Ghent during the Hundred Days in 1815
- François-Auguste Gevaert, composer (1828–1908)
- Rosalie Loveling, poet, novelist, and essayist (1834–1875)
- Virginie Loveling, poet, novelist, and essayist (1836–1923)
- Frans Rens, writer, (1805–1874)

=== 20th century ===
- Erwin Schrödinger, physicist (1877-1961)
- Paul van Imschoot, Roman Catholic biblical theologian (1889-1968)
- Arend Joan Rutgers, physical chemist and professors at the Ghent University (1903–1998)
- Jean Daskalidès, gynecologist and director of Leonidas chocolates (1922–1992)
- Hugo Claus, author, poet, dramatist, film and stage director (1929–2008)
- Jan Hoet, founder of SMAK (Stedelijk Museum voor Actuele Kunst) (born 1936)
- Wilfried Martens, Christian Democratic politician and prime minister (born 1936)
- Royden Rabinowitch, Canadian sculptor (born 1943)
- Patrick Sercu, Belgian track cyclist (born 1944)
- Guy Verhofstadt, liberal politician and prime minister (born 1953)
- Johan Vande Lanotte, lawyer and politician (born 1955)
- Herman Brusselmans, novelist and poet (born 1957)
- Leen Ryckaert, psychologist (born 1957)
- Dirk Braeckman, photographer (born 1958)
- Tom Lanoye, novelist and poet (born 1958)
- Peter Vermeersch, composer, clarinet player, and producer (born 1959)
- Michaël Borremans, painter (born 1963)
- Lucas de Lil, composer and conductor (born 1963)
- Erwin Mortier, author and poet (born 1965)
- Bianka Panova, rhythmic gymnast (born 1970)
- Swen Vincke, video game director (born 1972)
- Lorenz Bogaert, entrepreneur (born 1976)
- Gabriel Ríos, Puerto Rican musician (born 1978)
- Tyler Farrar, American cyclist (born 1984)
- Bolis Pupul,
