= Humanist Greek =

Field of study of the ancient Greek language

Humanist Greek refers to a field of study focusing on the usage of the ancient Greek language during the Renaissance and later in connection with the humanistic movement. Perhaps more broadly, New Ancient Greek (also known as Humanist Greek, Neo-Greek and Neo-Paleo Greek, German: Neualtgriechisch) is used to describe the form of Ancient Greek used by authors from the Renaissance onwards to compose literary texts of various sorts and genres.

The revival of Ancient Greek in Western Europe was closely connected to the arrival of Byzantine scholars and migrants after the Fall of Constantinople (1453), who helped transmit Greek manuscripts, language, and learning to Italy and the rest of Europe. Its use flourished alongside Humanistic Latin (though not on the same extent), creating a form of learned bilingualism that gradually became anchored in early modern intellectual culture on a European scale.

The study of ancient Greek, initially practised by only a few of the early humanists, became a formative element of humanistic education. Near the end of 15th century, a tradition of composing verses in ancient Greek was begun in Italy, whence it spread to the rest of Western Europe. The heyday of the movement took place in Germany, the Low Countries, and parts of France during the 16th and early 17th centuries BC. Humanist Greek texts were also composed in Britain, central Europe, the Baltic and the Nordic countries as well as Russia.

Research into Humanist Greek has been developing rapidly since the 2010s. Since then, there have been international conferences dedicated to the field, and several volumes have been published, as well as a database comprising texts from Sweden, Finland, Estonia, and Latvia.

== Definition ==
The term "Humanist Greek" was coined in the 1970s. In a broad sense, it can refer not only to the usage of ancient Greek by western scholars but by Byzantine Greeks as well. The term "Renaissance Greek" has sometimes been used but is poorly suited for describing post-Renaissance usage. In German, the term "Neualtgriechisch" ("new ancient Greek") is sometimes used. It is a sister field to Neo-Latin studies.

On the other hand, others have suggested limiting the term "Humanist Greek" to the early Modern period before the 19th-century Neohumanismus, which led to considerable changes in classical education. With the rise of classical philology, composing in Greek was no longer a part of general Greek instruction and was practised only by a few of the most learned.

In the broadest sense, however, Humanist Greek covers texts written in ancient Greek from the early Renaissance until the present day. The present article will focus mostly on verse compositions written before the 19th century.

== History and notable practitioners ==
=== Beginnings in Italy ===
The early 15th century in Italy was marked by a renewed interest in antiquity. At the same time, Byzantine émigrés were recruited in various universities to teach ancient Greek, beginning with Manuel Chrysoloras' appointment in Florence in 1397. This made ancient Greek texts available to an Italian audience and led to the first attempts by Italian humanists to compose verses in Greek.

Francesco Filelfo (1398–1481), who stayed in Constantinople in the 1420s, wanted to create a "poetic bilingualism" by introducing Greek as a language of versification alongside Latin in Western culture. His De psychagogia, a collection of elegies and Sapphic odes, remained largely unknown until its publication in 1997.

A younger contemporary of Filelfo, the Florentine Angelo Poliziano (1454–1494) surpassed his predecessor in poetic skill and influentiality. His Liber epigrammatum graecorum, published posthumously as part of his collected Opera (1498), was the first book of original "ancient" Greek poetry printed in Western Europe. The epigrams were influenced by various ancient poets from Homer to the late antique Nonnus as well as the Greek Anthology, edited by Ianos Laskaris in Florence in 1494. They bear witness to Poliziano's extensive learning and proficiency in Greek versification.

In the aftermath of Poliziano's influence and the publication of the Greek Anthology, several intellectuals in Tuscany and other regions tried their hand at composing Greek verse and prose. They included Poliziano's student Scipione Forteguerri Carteromaco (1466–1515) and Aldo Manuzio (1449–1515), who published Poliziano's collected works. Among other genres, Tuscan humanists composed encomiastic and epideictic epigrams as well as book-epigrams. In the region of Veneto and Friuli, a distinct tradition arose, presented, for example, by Lazaro Bonamico (1477–1552), Francesco Robortello (1516–1567), and Giovan Battista Amalteo (1525–1573). Robortello went on to develop a theory of the epigram, and both he and Amalteo composed Pindaric odes. Their contemporary Pietro Cortona (died ca. 1598) published an entire volume titled Varia carmina Graeca (1555) that included poems dedicated to his Italian and Bavarian friends, who included Joachim Camerarius (see below).

By the mid-16th century, the heyday of Italian humanism was over, and the epicentre of classical studies had shifted to France, Germany, and the Low Countries. In Italy, the religious environment of the Counter-Reformation and the association of Greek poetry with pagan and licentious topics led to a decline in Greek studies. The Benedictine monk Tito Prospero Martinengo (died 1594), however, composed an erudite book of Christian Greek odes (1582), which display his familiarity with Hellenistic and Imperial hexametre. Another exception to the general decline was Maffeo Barberini (later Pope Urban VIII) (1568–1644) and his circle of intellectuals, who composed encomiastic, ekphrastic, and paraphrastic poetry in various metres.

The 18th century saw an antiquarian revival in several cities, but an interest in Greek versification was not properly revived until the end of the century under foreign influence. The most important centre of Greek studies at the time was Naples, which had a lively Greek community. The local Hellenist scholar and revolutionary Pasquale Baffi (1749–1799) composed a Pindaric ode for Catherine the Great. He was also in correspondence with European colleagues, with whom he discussed the newly-discovered Herculaneum papyri. His contemporary Clotilde Tambroni (1758–1817), professor of Greek at the University of Bologna, was probably inspired by her teacher, the Spanish Manuel Aponte, to write conventional and encomiastic odes.

In the 19th and 20th centuries, erudite versification in ancient Greek continued to be practised, although unsystematically. The Romantic poet and classical scholar Giacomo Leopardi (1798–1837) composed an Anacreontic Hymn to the Moon (1817). A few lines are extant of a Greek epic on Giuseppe Garibaldi's deeds by a young Giovanni Pascoli (1855–1912), who later became a famed Latin poet. By his time, Greek had been established as an integral part of the humanistic curriculum.

Since the early 19th century, Greek epigrams have mainly been written by university professors in Italy and elsewhere in Europe with varying results. Among them are Luigi Illuminati (1881–1962) and Girolamo Vitelli (1849–1935), whose Subsiciva (1927), a collection of Greek and Latin poems, displays his philological and linguistic knowledge and literary skill. More recently, Alvaro Rissa, a pseudonym for a professor of Greek at the University of Genoa, has published poems in ancient Greek that combine ancient and modern topics and draw influence from epic, lyric, as well as tragedy.

=== Germany ===
In the area of modern Germany, the prominence of Greek studies led to its leading role in the field during the 16th century. This resulted partly from the high esteem of Greek language and literature within the Protestant movement in contrast with Roman Catholicism.

The first period of heightened interest in writing in ancient Greek began with the Renaissance in the 16th century and lasted until the first half of the 18th century. Greek was introduced in Germany around the year 1500. During the first three decades of the century, there were isolated attempts at composing epigrams by such scholars as Nicolaus Marschalk (1460s–1525), Conrad Celtis (1459–1508), Willibald Pirckheimer (1470–1530), and Johannes Reuchlin (1455–1522). They were influenced by editions published by Aldo Manuzio, especially the volume containing Poliziano's collected works. After a modest beginning, the gradual institution of Greek professorships at German universities combined with Italian influence provided the background for an increasing learning in Greek.

The earliest humanists who took to composing in ancient Greek on a larger scale were Reuchlin's protégé Philipp Melanchthon (1497–1560) and his student Joachim Camerarius (1500–1574). Camerarius published a collection of poems by him and Jacob Micyllus (1503–1558) titled Epigrammata veterum poetarum (1538). These scholars successfully encouraged others to write in ancient Greek, and, since the 1540s, an increasing number of poetic texts were published. The most eminent poets of the time were Paul Dolscius (1526–1589), Johannes Caselius (1533–1613), Johannes Posselius (1528–1591), and Michael Neander (1525–1595), who was headmaster of the monasterial school of Ilfeld. The most famous pupil of his school was Laurentius Rhodoman (1545/6–1606), philologist and one of the most eminent composers of Greek poetry during the Renaissance. He wrote epics on Christian topics and Greek mythology as well as an epyllion in the Doric dialect titled Arion.

Apart from Rhodoman, the apogée of the era of Greek composition in Germany was represented by Nikolaus Reusner (1545–1602) and Martin Crusius (1526–1607), who tried various poetic forms, including Pindaric ode. Among their contemporaries was the Italian poet Olympia Fulvia Morata (1526–1555), who moved to Germany due to her Protestant convictions and composed in Greek, Latin, and Italian.

During the 17th and 18th centuries, Greek versification exhibited playful experimentation and Baroque tastes. Productions of the era included polyglot and figurative poems. On the other hand, as Greek lost its status as an independent discipline and became part of the study of Oriental languages, its importance was diminished. During this time, there were few outstanding poets who practised Greek versification. An exception was Johann Gottfried Herrichen (1629–1705), who composed Theocritean and Anacreontic verses that were published posthumously in 1717. In the Saxon Fürstenschulen, especially Schulpforta, Greek composition continued.

The publication by Georgius Lizelius (1694–1761) of a Historia Poetarum Graecorum Germaniae in 1730 marked the end of the first heyday of Greek versification in the area of modern Germany. The era of "Neo-humanism" saw a revival of this practice from the beginning of the 19th century until the Second World War. An early representative of this movement was the classical scholar Friedrich Thiersch (1784–1860), who published a collection of Greek poems. Instead of novel compositions, there was a tendency towards translating classical German poems into Greek, both for the purposes of linguistic training as well as proving the existence of a mental cognation between the Greeks and the Germans.

Until the mid-19th century, original compositions by pupils often focused on ancient and German history and were performed at the end of the school year. Such poems are known from the classicist Friedrich Wilhelm Ritschl (1806–1876) and Friedrich Engels (1820–1895). Other works of the time include a parodistic epic and Anacreontic verses by Eduard Eyth (1809–1884) as well three comedies in Aristophanes' style by Julius Richter (1816–1877), whose work displays a conservative and satirical attitude that has parallels in the Neo-Latin literature of the time. Finally, the Greek and Latin poems of the great philologist Ulrich von Wilamowitz-Moellendorff (1848–1931), an alumnus of Schulpforta, were posthumously collected and published by his students, some of whom continued writing in ancient Greek.

Since the Second World War, no unified school or community of ancient Greek composition has arisen in Germany, although there have been occasional attempts to revive the tradition; most notably, the journal Alindethra, published between 1954 and 1967, which contained older and new texts in ancient Greek.

=== The Low Countries ===
Research on ancient Greek composition practised in the Low Countries is still in its early stages. The emphasis of the corpus so far uncovered is in the 16th and 17th centuries, starting with Erasmus' (1466/1467/1469–1536) first attempts in the early 16th century. The poems are metrically diverse. The genres range from occasional poetry to poems on national, regional, and local topics as well as love poems. Their style is characterized by unidiomatic expressions and a liking for neologisms and rare words, and the language often suggests the influence of the writer's mother tongue or Latin.

The Collegium Trilingue in Leuven, founded in 1517, attracted students of Greek from all over Europe. Together with Antwerp, Ghent, and Liège, the city was a principal place of Greek learning until about 1580, when the centre of gravity shifted to Leiden and other cities of the north in result of the wars of religion. A Golden Age of Greek versification took place from around 1550 until around 1650, peaking between 1580 and 1610, after which it rapidly declined.

Most poetry was produced in circles connected with universities and printing houses by students, scholars, and clerics. Willem van de Ven (b. 1548), teacher in the town of Sint-Oederode, who wrote a prayer to Saint Oda of Scotland inspired by Theognis, was an exception. No poem by a woman is extant: the Greek verses of the polyglot Anna Maria van Schurman (1607–1678), whose correspondence in Greek has survived, are lost.

Humanist Greek poetry had a limited readership, although some poems were read and translated into Dutch and Latin, such as Joseph Justus Scaliger's (1540–1609) praise of Batavia (ca. 1600–1602). Scaliger was born in France but stayed in the Low Countries from 1593 until his death. He studied Greek in Paris under Adrien Turnèbe. In 1593, he accepted a position at Leiden University. He produced editions of ancient texts and researched ancient chronology. He was a prolific poet in Greek and Latin; collections of his verses were published in 1610 and 1615.

His contemporary, Bonaventura Vulcanius (1538–1614) taught Greek in Leiden for thirty years. Like Scaliger, he wrote many poems in Greek and Latin, including religious odes and a Greek eulogy on the city of Dordrecht. A student of Scaliger and Vulcanius, subsequently professor and librarian at Leiden, Daniel Heinsius (1580–1655) was a versatile author. His Greek productions include humorous poems, a love poem, and a letter addressed to Scaliger. His main contribution to Humanist Greek was his collection of poems on ancient philosophers and authors titled Peplus Graecorum epigrammatum (1613), which he dedicated to his friend and fellow student Hugo Grotius. Grotius (1583–1645) tried his pen at composing a Pindaric ode in the Doric dialect when he was only eleven or twelve years old and continued to compose in Greek later in life. In 1921, he managed to escape from Loevestein Castle, where he had been imprisoned for siding with the Remonstrants, by hiding in a book chest, on which Heinsius composed a poem in elegiac couplets.

Another alumnus of Leiden, Petrus Francius (1645–1704), published a collection of Greek poems in 1697 while professor at the Amsterdam Athenaeum Illustre. He urged his students to compose in Greek and perform their work, introducing the performances with short Greek orations. His own poems include Anacreontic "drinking songs" on Chinese herbal tea.

Among the few practitioners of ancient Greek composition in the 19th and 20th centuries were the classical scholar and poet Johan Andreas dèr Mouw (1863–1919) and Bernard Abraham van Groeningen (1894–1987), professor of Greek at Leiden University. Dèr Mouw's small collection of Greek and Latin poems, published posthumously in 1919, focuses mainly on classical themes: it includes a piece imitating Aeschylus' style, an occasional poem, a love poem, and epigrams. Van Groeningen, who specialized in papyrology and Greek lyricism, published a collection of Greek verses in 1972 that includes mainly occasional poems and translations from Dutch.

=== France ===
From around 1520 until 1620, a wealth of poetry in ancient Greek was composed in France by humanist scholars, beginning with François Rabelais (died 1553). Many of the authors were associated with the Collège royal, founded in 1530, such as Jean Dorat (1508–1588), who wrote about sixty poems in Greek.

Dorat's students included Jean-Antoine de Baïf (1532–1589) and Rémy Belleau (1528–1577), who were members of the group of poets called La Pléiade since 1554. Both of them composed in Greek, and a few poems were dedicated to their leader, Pierre de Ronsard. The group's founder Joachim Du Bellay defended a reform of the French language and literature through the imitation of Greek and Latin words, genres, and topics. There was, in fact, a popular theory during the Renaissance that the French language was derived directly from ancient Greek: it was maintained, among others, by Henri II Estienne (Henricus Stephanus) (1528?–1598), who also wrote Greek poems.

Others who composed in Greek included Stephanus' pupil Florent Chrestien (1541–1596), who produced a praise of typography, and Denis Pétau (1583–1652), from whom we have a hymn to Sainte Geneviève.

The last phase of the flourishing of Humanist Greek poetry is represented by the philologist Gilles Ménage (1613–1692), who composed poems in Greek and Latin, Bernard de La Monnoye (1641–1728), and Jean Boivin (1663–1726), who dedicated a poem to Anne Dacier. Their learned circle was ridiculed by Molière in Les Femmes savantes (1672), which marked the end of a golden era of Humanist Greek composition.

After the Renaissance, the practice almost died, with a few exceptions, such as the anthology Recentiores poetae Latini et Graeci selecti published in 1743. Later, Greek poetry has been written by André Chénier (1762–1794), Léon Vernier (1855–1926), and Fernand Chapouthier (1899–1953).

=== Great Britain ===
The history of Greek composition in Great Britan differs from that in continental Europe. While the 18th century marked a decline in many countries, in Britain, there is no major interruption. This is partly explained by the earlier rise of classicism and the Enlightenment. Another difference is the important role played by poetry competitions that were established at the end of the 18th century and during the 19th century. In general, the British material represents a great variety of poetic forms and metres.

The interest in Greek versification took root in Britain later than in the continent. The work of early Hellenists such as William Grocyn (ca. 1446–1519), Thomas Linacre (1460–1524), and Richard Croke (ca. 1489–1558) in the beginning of the 16th century did not have a widespread influence. A major factor in the establishment of Greek in English universities was Erasmus' visit to England, yet between 1520 and 1560, there was a reduction in Greek studies, which reflected fears associated with the Reformation. This came to an end with the establishment of Protestantism following Queen Elizabeth I's accession in 1558. Yet with the exception of the tragedy Jephthah by the Catholic scholar John Christopherson (died 1558), there is a dearth of Greek compositions until the end of the century.

The situation changed during the 17th century. Events of the royal family were celebrated in Greek compositions. The universities of Oxford and Cambridge published collections of congratulatory poems (1603–1763), which contained Greek pieces. During the Restoration era, Greek and Latin became an essential part of the English "gentleman's" training. This led to a wide variety of novel compositions, such as the Baroque poems of John Milton (1608–1674) and James Duport (1606–1679), as well as Edward Wells' (1667–1727) supplement on the didactic poem of Dionysius Periegetes, in which he described the American continent and modern cities. In contrast with continental Europe, where Greek versification was mainly the prerogative of classical scholars, in Britain it was practised by many notable poets, among them George Herbert (1593–1633), Samuel Johnson (1709–1784), Samuel Taylor Coleridge (1772–1834), and Algernon Charles Swinburne (1837–1909).

From the end of the 17th century, British classical scholarship saw significant progress thanks to the work of scholars such as Joshua Barnes (1654–1712), Richard Bentley (1662–1742), and Richard Porson (1759–1808). In the following century, famous competitions began to be established. The Sir William Browne's Medal, awarded by the University of Cambridge since 1775, originally had series for the composition of a Greek ode in Sappho's style, a Latin ode in Horace's style, and two epigrams, one in the style of the Greek Anthology and one in imitation of Martial. The subjects of the compositions display a wide range, often focusing on contemporary events. Another famous competition that is still extant is the Gaisford Prize, established at the University of Oxford in 1855.

During the 19th century, composition in Greek consisted mainly of competition pieces and translations of English and Latin poetry and prose. The latter were produced especially during the Victorian era. Anthologies of both types of poems were published in considerable numbers until the first half of the 20th century. Furthermore, the 19th century saw a renewed enthusiasm for Greek versification in Britain. While Latin was falling out of fashion, Greek appealed to the tastes of learned individuals, including the classicists Richard Claverhouse Jebb (1841–1905), Walter Headlam (1866–1908), and Ronald A. Knox (1888–1957), each of whom wrote original poems. The Greek odes written by George Stuart Robertson (1872–1967) and Armand D'Angour (born 1958) for the Olympic games held in Athens in 1896 and 2004, respectively, also deserve mention.

=== Nordic countries (including Estonia and Latvia) ===
In the Nordic countries, the Humanist Greek tradition was at its strongest in the Early Modern period. The Reformation had a crucial role in its beginning and development. Initially, Greek was studied in order to read and translate the Bible. It was learned from books and by travelling abroad, especially to German universities, and the earliest poems in the 1550s were printed in Germany and the Low Countries. In the last three decades of the century, Greek printing types became available in the Nordic countries as well, which led to the flourishing of Humanist Greek poetry.

An early pioneer in Greek studies was Johannes Rudbeck (1581–1646), professor at Uppsala University and bishop of Västerås, who held a private collegium from 1610–1613 where Greek and Latin were the only spoken languages. The reform of the Swedish school system in the first decades of the 17th century and the founding of new universities and gymnasia that endorsed Greek studies led to the first flourishing of Greek versification from the mid-1630s until the 1650s. The most important of these were the gymnasia in Västerås (1623), Tartu and Turku (1630), Riga and Tallinn (1631) and the universities in Tartu (1632), Turku (1640), and Lund (1666).

The outbreak of the plague and the Second Northern War in the middle of the century led to a brief decline, after which a second peak in Greek composition began near the end of the century. Regional differences were now more marked: in Estonia and Latvia, the beginning of the Great Northern War in 1700 and the ensuing Russian rule led to an interruption, although poems in ancient Greek continued to be written in Riga and Tallinn and in connection with the court in Jelgava until the 1730s. In Denmark and the Swedish empire, the tradition only started to weaken in the mid-18th century.

In the 19th century, Greek studies were resumed with a fresh vigour within an altered scholarly environment. Writing in Greek was now practised mostly by a small circle of academics and schoolteachers. Even in the 20th and 21st centuries, some professors have continued to write dedicatory epigrams in Sweden, Finland, and Estonia.

The Nordic corpus is diverse in terms of genre, metre, and poetic form. Epigrams and occasional poems commemorating events in the lives of educated people, nobility, and royalty were produced since the mid-16th century. In Uppsala, hexametre orations were popular between 1640 and 1680. Other popular genres include Pindaric odes as well as dedications and congratulations printed in books and dissertations. In addition to verse, there are Greek letters, stipendium applications, lapidaries, and short congratulatory prose texts, which were popular at the end of the 17th century and in the 18th century, as well as prefaces and dedications in teaching manuals and text editions. Orations were composed on various subjects in prose and verse forms. Multilingualism is typical of the Nordic examples. In Sweden, there was also a strong tradition of disputing in Greek between 1620 and the 1820s.

The language is a mixture of dialects dominated by Homeric and Attic forms, the latter becoming more pronounced towards the 18th century. The syntax is sometimes unusual, especially the use of particles, and the rules of prosody tend to be overlooked until the 19th century, when the impact of modern classical scholarship is discernible.

==== Denmark, Norway, and Iceland ====
The Danish tradition of Humanist Greek is rich and probably the oldest in the Nordic countries but, to date, remains understudied. Greek studies received an impetus from the support of King Christian II and were practised at Copenhagen University as early as the 1520s. The first Danish poet to write in Greek was probably the Catholic humanist Jakob Jespersen (fl. 1529–1549), who studied in the Collegium Trilingue in Leuven (see above) and permanently relocated to the Low Countries due to the Reformation.

After a short period of inactivity in the 1530s caused by the Reformation, humanist culture became firmly established in Denmark by the 1550s. Among the poets who composed in Greek were Peder Aagesen and Torben Nielsen, who published wedding poems in 1568 and 1572, respectively, and Niels Leuridsen (ca. 1547–1579), professor in Copenhagen, whose Greek oeuvre includes a hexametre oration and Bible paraphrases.

Other important Hellenists who were active in Denmark include Petrus Ivarus Borrichius (1563–1627), who published a hexametre paraphrase of the story of Hercules at the crossroads (1595); Bertel Knudsen Aquilonius (1588–1650), rector and vicar, who produced a collection of Greek epigrams; Peder Winstrup (1605–1679), bishop of Lund; and Rasmus Polsen Vinding (1615–1684), professor of Greek in Copenhagen, whose Latin oration De regno hereditario (1640) ends with a collection of Greek poems in elegiacs (Carmen ad dulcissimam Patriam).

From Norway and Iceland, there is far scantier evidence. Borrichius spent the last decades of his life in Trondheim, where he worked as cantor and lector at the cathedral school since 1601. From Iceland, there are at least two Greek poems, including a funeral poem by Torfi Pálsson (1673–1712) that was printed in Copenhagen in 1695.

==== Sweden ====
The bulk of the poetry composed in the area of modern Sweden comprises academic congratulations, often printed in dissertations. There are panegyrics addressed to royalty and court members. They often emphasize the role of Queen Christina, although the De La Gardie and Oxenstierna families were also patrons of Greek studies.

The earliest poets in ancient Greek who were active in Sweden were the German Heinrich Moller (1528–1567) and the Swedish Laurentius Petri Gothus (1529/1530–1579), professor of Greek at Uppsala University and subsequently archbishop of Sweden. Uppsala was the largest centre of Greek composition in Sweden, and many of its professors were prolific Greek poets. Among the earliest were Johannes Stalenus (professor 1624–1640) and Henrik Ausius (1603–1659), during whose tenures many Greek student orations were presented and printed.

Petrus Aurivillius (1637–1677), who defended a Greek disputation under Ausius and was subsequently appointed professor of Greek, composed epigrams, a prose oration, and a panegyrical epitaph on the death of two brothers of the De La Gardie family. Among the other professors at Uppsala University who composed in Greek were Laurentius Norrmannus (1651–1703), Martin Brunnerus (1627–1679), and Johan(nes) Bilberg (1646–1717).

Apart from Uppsala, important centres of Greek composition were Stockholm, the Strängnäs and Västerås gymnasia, and Lund University. Josef Thun (1661–1721), lector in Strängnäs, left a considerable legacy of Greek poetry and may have been the most accomplished Greek poet from the Nordic countries.

From the 1730s, Greek composition dwindled, and by the end of the century, the tradition was nearly extinct. In the 19th century, there were isolated instances of occasional poetry, whose character reflected the current romantic and classicistic ideals. Dissertations were written in Greek, one by Erik Engelbert Östling (1807–1870), who also wrote a poem commemorating the death of Esaias Tegnér in 1846. Since the 19th century, Greek versification has been practised mostly by classical scholars, such as Johan Bergman (1864–1951), who worked in Tartu and Stockholm, and Albert Wifstrand (1901–1964) and Jerker Blomqvist (born 1938), professors of Greek in Lund.

==== Finland (and Karelia) ====
The material from the area of modern Finland and Karelia includes occasional poetry (especially funerary poems), hexametre orations, texts for academic occasions, applications for scholarships, and a great number of short prose congratulations written in Turku during the last decades of the 17th century.

Finnish composition in ancient Greek begins with the poems of Aeschillus Petraeus printed in Wittenberg (1623) and Rostock (1628). Two decades later, in 1648, the first Greek poems were printed at the newly-established University of Turku. Some important Hellenists of Swedish origin were active in Turku, such as Josef Thun (see above), who studied there, as well as Nicolaus Nycopensis and Johannes Gezelius the Elder (1615–1690), who spent part of their academic or clerical careers there.

The heyday of Humanist Greek in Turku occurred between the 1670s and 1710s, when numerous poems were written by students. The most notable work from this period is the hexametre oration Magnus Principatus Finlandia (1678) by Johan Paulinus (ennobled Lillienstedt) (1655–1732), which had a remarkable role in the development of the country's national political identity. Greek poems were also written by professors of eloquence, such as Martin Miltopaeus (1631–1679) and Christiernus Alander (1660–1704), and renowned members of the elite, including the poet Johan(nes) Cajanus (1655–1681) and the Fennophile Daniel Juslenius (1676–1752).

The Great Northern War dealt a blow to the Humanist Greek tradition, which lead to the fading of occasional poetry after the university was reopened in 1722. A new subgenre of Greek dedications in disputations emerged, however. In the 19th century, the future Finnish national poet Johan Ludvig Runeberg (1804–1877) composed a satiric Ἔπος γελοῖον (Epos geloion) (1826). In the 20th and 21st centuries, the tradition of ancient Greek composition has been revived by Erkki Sironen, senior lecturer at the University of Helsinki, who has composed about 25 epigrams for various occasions.

==== Estonia and Latvia ====
While there is no certain evidence of ethnic Estonians or Latvians composing in Greek before the 21st century, several Baltic German students and scholars were active in the area of modern Estonia and Latvia, as were academics from other parts of the Swedish empire. Greek poetry was composed at the University of Tartu (and Pärnu) as well as in Tallinn, Riga, and the court of Jelgava.

The earliest advocates of Humanist Greek in Estonia were of German origin, including Gregor Krüger Mesylanus, who addressed his Greek poems to readers in Tallinn and Riga in 1554, and Peter Götsch, professor of Greek and oriental languages, who presented his inaugural oration in 1632 in Greek hexametres and also published shorter poems in Greek. The Swedish-born Johannes Gezelius the Elder (see above) worked at University of Tartu as professor of Greek and Hebrew from 1642 until 1649, during which time he published, among other works, manuals for teaching Greek, a Greek grammar, and a Greek-Latin lexicon and wrote occasional poems in Greek.

Several professors of Tallinn Gymnasium wrote Greek verse, as did students, some of whom would congratulate each other on academic occasions with poems after continuing their careers abroad. One of them was Georg Dunte (1631–1677), who congratulated his friend for a dissertation in hexametres and also wrote poems for weddings and funerals. Greek versification in Tallinn ceased after 1734, although since the university's reopening in 1802, isolated attempts have been made to revive the tradition.

At the Riga Academic Gymnasium, many types of occasional poems were published, such as a poem in Anacreontics for the opening of the University of Tartu, composed by Aggaeus Friderici (1584–1657), professor of Greek. Among others who were active in Riga was Martin Francke (fl. 1647–1653) from Narva, who published three Greek poems during his studies. Despite their small number, the poems from Riga exhibit a broad variety of metres and forms, including anagram and polyglot poems as well as acrostics.

== Notable works ==
- Academic Examination (Ἡ Ἀνάκρισις ἀκαδημαϊκή. Ἔπος γελοῖον), Johan Ludvig Runeberg (1826)
- Arion (Ἀρίων), Laurentius Rhodoman (1567?/1588)
- Astronautilia (Ἀστροναυτιλία), Jan Křesadlo (1995)
- The Bugs (Ἶπες), Julius Richter (1871)
- The City of Graces (Χαρίτων πόλις), Ludwig Mayr (1897/1902)
- The Crown (Στέφανος), Theodorus Korsch (1886)
- Diegesis or Versified account of the famous game of the Florentines, called by them ‘calcioʼ, by the ancients harpastos (Διήγησις τοῦ κλεινοῦ ἀγῶνος τῶν Φλωρεντινῶν διὰ στίχων, ὅστις παρ’ ἐκείνοις μὲν Κάλτζιον, παρὰ δὲ τοῖς ἀρχαίοις ἀποκαλεῖται Ἁρπαστόν), Georgios Koressios (1611)
- The duel of Eteocles and Polynices (Ἐτεοκλοῦς καὶ Πολυνείκους μονομαχία), Friederich Engels (1837)
- Epigramms (Liber epigrammatum graecorum), Angelo Poliziano (Omnia Opera, 1498)
- Epistles (Ἐπιστολαί), Anna Maria van Schurman (Opuscula Hebræa, Græca, Latina, Gallica. Prosaica et Metrica, 1648)
- Graces, an idyl (Χάριτες, εἰδύλλιον), Adam František Kollár (1756)
- Greek epigramms (Ἑλληνικὰ ἐπιγράμματα), Ioannes Kottounios (1653)
- Greek poems (Poematum Graecorum libri duo), Martin Crusius (1567)
- Greek poems (Μιχαήλου Ῥετελλίου ποιημάτων ἑλληνικῶν βίβλοι δύο), Michael Retell (1571)
- Harlemiad (Ἁρλεμιὰς ἢ ἐξήγησις τῆς πολιορκίας τῆς πόλεως Ἁρλεμίης), Nicolaas Jansz. van Wassenaar (1605)
- Helen and Alexander (Τὰ καθ᾽ Ἑλένην καὶ Ἀλέξανδρον), Demetrios Moschos (1493)
- Hellas (Ἑλλάς), Leone Allacci (1642)
- Hilarolypos: Happy and Sad (Ἱλαρόλυπος), Edward Eyth (1840)
- Idylls or Heroes (Εἰδύλλια ἢ Ἥρωες, καὶ ἄλλα ποιημάτιά τινα), Johannes Foreestius (1605)
- Jephthah (Ἰεφθάε), John Christopherson (1544)
- Lament on the destruction of Greece (Θρῆνος εἰς τὴν Ἑλλάδος καταστροφήν), Antonios Eparchos (1544)
- Mantle of Greek Epigramms (Peplus Graecorum epigrammatum), Daniel Heinsius (1613)
- Praise of Antwerp (Εἰς τὴν μεγαλοπρεπεστάτην, καὶ πάντων τῶν Βελγῶν λαμπροτάτην πόλιν τὴν Ἀνδωβερπαίαν ὕμνος), Georgius Schroegelius (1565)
- Telephoniazusae (Τηλεφωνιάζουσαι), Ronald Knox (1918)
- Troica (Τρωικά), Laurentius Rhodoman (1588/1604)
- Various poems in Greek and Latin (Ποιήματα διάφορα Ἑλληνικὰ καὶ Λατινικά), Tito Prospero Martinengo (1582)
- Xenophon's Heracles (Ξενοφῶντος Ἡρακλῆς), Petrus Ivarus Borrichius (1595)

== Bibliography ==
- Akujärvi, Johanna (2020). "Neo-Latin Texts and Humanist Greek Paratexts. On Two Wittenberg Prints Dedicated to Crown Prince Erik of Sweden", in Kajava et al. (eds.), 75–104.
- Akujärvi, Johanna – Korhonen, Tua – Päll, Janika – Sironen, Erkki (2022). "Nordic Countries", in Pontani – Weise (eds.), 722–801.
- Bērziņa, Gita (2018). "16th–17th-Century Greek Texts at the Academic Library of the University of Latvia", in Päll – Volt (eds.), 40–56.
- Kajava, Mika – Korhonen, Tua – Vesterinen, Jamie (eds.) (2020). Meilicha Dôra: Poems and Prose in Greek from Renaissance and Early Modern Europe (Commentationes Humanarum Litterarum 138). Helsinki.
- Korhonen, Tua (2020). "Introduction", in Kajava – Korhonen – Vesterinen (eds.), i–viii.
- Korhonen, Tua (2022). To the Glory That Was Greece: Ideas, Ideals and Practices in Composing Humanist Greek during the Seventeenth Century (Commentationes Humanarum Litterarum 143). Helsinki.
- Lamers, Han – Van Rooy, Raf (2022). "The Low Countries", in Pontani – Weise (eds.), 216–279.
- Päll, Janika – Volt, Ivo (2018). "Editors' Preface", in Päll – Volt (eds.), 9–16.
- Päll, Janika – Volt, Ivo (eds.) (2018). Hellenostephanos: Humanist Greek in Early Modern Europe: Learned Communities between Antiquity and Contemporary Culture (Acta Societatis Morgensternianae VI–VII). Tartu. Hellenostephanos. Humanist Greek in Early Modern Europe: Learned Communities between Antiquity and Contemporary Culture
- Pontani, Filippomaria (2022). "Italy", in Pontani – Weise (eds.), 82–145.
- Pontani, Filippomaria – Weise, Stefan (2022). "General Introduction", in Pontani – Weise (eds.), 1–24.
- Pontani, Filippomaria – Weise, Stefan (eds.) (2022). The Hellenizing Muse: A European Anthology of Poetry in Ancient Greek from the Renaissance to the Present. Berlin – Boston.
- Sanchi, Luigi-Alberto – Flamand, Jean-Marie – Menini, Romain (2022). "France", in Pontani – Weise (eds.), 358–402.
- Weise, Stefan (2017). "Prooimion", in Weise (ed.), 7–12.
- Weise, Stefan (ed.) (2017). Hellenisti! Altgriechisch als Literatursprache im neuzeitlichen Europa. Stuttgart.
- Weise, Stefan (2022a). "Germany", in Pontani – Weise (eds.), 146–215.
- Weise, Stefan (2022b). "Great Britain", in Pontani – Weise (eds.), 482–557.
