= Minuscule 154 =

- New Testament manuscript
- Name: Alexandrino-Vaticanus
- Text: Gospels
- Date: 13th-century
- Script: Greek
- Now at: Vatican Library
- Size: 26.3 cm by 20.7 cm
- Category: none
- Note: marginalia

Minuscule 154 (in the Gregory-Aland numbering), Θ^{ε402} (Soden), is a Greek minuscule manuscript of the New Testament, on cotton paper. Palaeographically, it has been assigned to the 13th-century. It has complex contents, and full marginalia.

== Description ==
The codex contains a complete text of the four Gospels on 355 paper leaves (size 26.3 cm by 20.7 cm), with a Theophylact's commentary.

The text is written in one column per page, in 40 lines per page. The paper has brown colour, written in black ink, with capital letters in red.

The text is divided according to the κεφαλαια (chapters), whose numbers are given at the margin, and their τιτλοι (titles of chapters) at the top of the pages. The references to the Eusebian Canons are absent.

It contains lectionary markings at the margin (for liturgical use), liturgical books with hagiographies (Synaxarion and Menologion), numbers of stichoi, and subscriptions at the end of each Gospel.

At the end of the manuscript is given subscription α υ μ β απριλλ(ιω) ιδ, ("April 14, 1442"), it was made by the later hand.

== Text ==
Kurt Aland did not place the Greek text of the codex in any Category. It was not examined by using the Claremont Profile Method.

== History ==
The manuscript probably was written in Italy. It is dated by the INTF to the 13th-century.

It was presented by Christina, Queen of Sweden, to Cardinal Decio Azzolino, and bought from him by Pope Alexander VII (1689–1691), together with the manuscripts 155, 156, and 181.

It was examined and described by Birch (about 1782), Scholz, and Henry Stevenson. C. R. Gregory saw it in 1886.

It is currently housed at the Vatican Library (Reg. gr. 28), in Rome.

== See also ==
- List of New Testament minuscules
- Biblical manuscript
- Textual criticism
