= R. C. Trevelyan =

English poet and translator (1872–1951)

Robert Calverl(e)y Trevelyan (/trɪˈvɛljən, -ˈvɪl-/; 28 June 1872 – 21 March 1951) was an English poet and translator, of a traditionalist sort, and a follower of the lapidary style of Logan Pearsall Smith.

== Life ==
Trevelyan was the second son of Sir George Trevelyan, 2nd Baronet, and his wife Caroline née Philips, who was the daughter of Robert Needham Philips MP, a Liberal Member of Parliament and textile merchant from Lancashire. Trevelyan was the brother of Sir Charles Trevelyan, 3rd Baronet, and of the historian G. M. Trevelyan.

He was born in Weybridge and educated at Wixenford (where he was known as "the Dodo" and was a particular friend of Frederick Lawrence), then at Harrow. From 1891 to 1895 he studied at Trinity College, Cambridge, where he became one of the Cambridge Apostles. He studied Classics and then law; his father wanted him to follow a career as a barrister, but his ambition was to be a poet.

Described as a "rumpled, eccentric poet", and sometimes considered a rather ineffectual person, he was close to the Bloomsbury Group, who called him 'Bob Trevy'. He had a wide further range of social connections: George Santayana from 1905; Isaac Rosenberg; Bernard Berenson; Bertrand Russell; G. E. Moore; E. M. Forster with whom he and Goldsworthy Lowes Dickinson travelled to India in 1912. His pacifist principles extended to sheltering John Rodker, "on the run" as a conscientious objector during World War I; when he became liable to conscription by the raising of the maximum age in 1918, he volunteered for the Friends' War Victims Relief Service, serving in France, August 1918 to March 1919.

Trevelyan married in 1900 the Dutch musician Elizabeth van der Hoeven; the artist Julian Trevelyan was their son.

== Works ==
Trevelyan wrote a number of verse plays; The Bride of Dionysus (1912) was made into an opera by Sir Donald Tovey.

== List of works ==
- Mallow and Asphodel (1898) poems
- Polyphemus and Other Poems (1901)
- Sisyphus: An Operatic Fable (1908)
- The Bride of Dionysus a music-Drama and Other Poems (1912)
- The New Parsifal: An Operatic Fable (1914)
- The Foolishness of Solomon (1915)
- The Pterodamozels: An Operatic Fable (1916)
- The Death of Man (1919) poems
- Translations from Lucretius (1920)
- The Oresteia of Aeschylus (1922) translator
- The Antigone of Sophocles (1924) translator
- The Ajax of Sophocles
- The Idylls of Theocritus (The Casanova Society, 1925) translator
- Poems and Fables (Hogarth Press, 1925)
- Thamyris: Is There a Future for Poetry? (1925) polemic
- The Deluge & Other Poems (Hogarth Press, 1926)
- Meleager (Hogarth Press, 1927)
- Three Plays: Sulla - Fand - The Pearl Tree (Hogarth Press, 1931)
- Rimeless Numbers (Hogarth Press, 1932)
- Selected Poems (1934)
- Beelzebub (Hogarth Press, 1935)
- De Rerum Natura by Lucretius (1937) translator
- The Collected Works of R. C. Trevelyan (1939) two volumes
- Aftermath (Hogarth Press, 1941)
- Translations from Leopardi (1941)
- Translations from Horace, Juvenal, & Montaigne. With Two Imaginary Conversations (1941)
- A Dream (privately published, 1941)
- The Eclogues and the Georgics of Virgil (1944) translator
- Windfalls: Notes & Essays (1944)
- From the Chinese (1945) translator
- Sophocles: Oedipus at Colonus (1946) translator
- From the Shiffolds (Hogarth Press, 1947)
- Translations from Latin Poetry (1949)
- Translations from Greek Poetry (1950)
