= Mortier (disambiguation) =

Mortier is a pipe organ builder.

Mortier may also refer to:

- Mortier (surname)
- Mortier, Newfoundland and Labrador, Canada
- French destroyer Mortier, a Claymore-class destroyer built for the French Navy
