= Minuscule 156 =

- New Testament manuscript
- Name: Alexandrino-Vaticanus
- Text: Gospels
- Date: 12th century
- Script: Greek
- Now at: Vatican Library
- Size: 12 cm by 10 cm
- Type: Byzantine text-type
- Category: V
- Note: marginalia

Minuscule 156 (in the Gregory-Aland numbering), ε 206 (Soden), is a Greek minuscule manuscript of the New Testament, on parchment. Paleographically it has been assigned to the 12th century. It has marginalia.

== Description ==
The codex contains a complete text of the four Gospels on 244 parchment leaves (size 12 cm by 10 cm). The text is written in one column per page, in 23 lines per page (size of text 8.2 by 6.7 cm). Titles are in gold.

The text is divided according to the κεφαλαια (chapters), whose numbers are given at the margin, and their τιτλοι (titles of chapters) at the top of the pages. There is also another division into smaller the Ammonian Sections (in Mark 241 sections - the last in 16:20), but without references to the Eusebian Canons.

It contains tables of the κεφαλαια (tables of contents) before each Gospel, synaxaria, and numbers of stichoi.

== Text ==
The Greek text of the codex is a representative of the Byzantine text-type. Hermann von Soden included it to the textual family Family K^{x}. Aland placed it in Category V. According to the Claremont Profile Method it belongs to the textual family Family K^{x} in Luke 10 and Luke 20. In Luke 1 it has mixed Byzantine text.

== History ==
On the first of its page it is written: "Ex bibliotheca [Melchioris] Goldasti" († 1625).

The manuscript was given by Christina of Sweden to Cardinal Decio Azzolino, and bought from him by Pope Alexander VII — like codices 154, 155, 181.

It was examined by Birch (about 1782), Scholz, and Oscar von Gebhardt (in 1882). C. R. Gregory saw it in 1886.

It is currently housed at the Vatican Library (Reg. gr. 189), at Rome.

== See also ==
- List of New Testament minuscules
- Biblical manuscript
- Textual criticism
