= Mortier (surname) =

Mortier is a surname. Notable people with the surname include:

- Édouard Mortier, Duke of Trévise (1768–1835), French general
- Erwin Mortier (born 1965), Belgian author
- Gerard Mortier (1943–2014), Belgian opera director
- Gilberte Mortier (1907–1991), French freestyle swimmer
- Hans Mortier (1924–2010), Dutch professional wrestler
- Marc Mortier (1948–2004), CEO of Flanders Expo from 1986 to 2002
- Michel Mortier (1925–2015), French furniture designer, interior designer and architect
- Pieter Mortier (1661–1711), 18th-century mapmaker and engraver from the Northern Netherlands
- Roland Mortier (1920–2015), Belgian scientist
