= Anders Spole =

Swedish mathematician and astronomer (1630–1699)

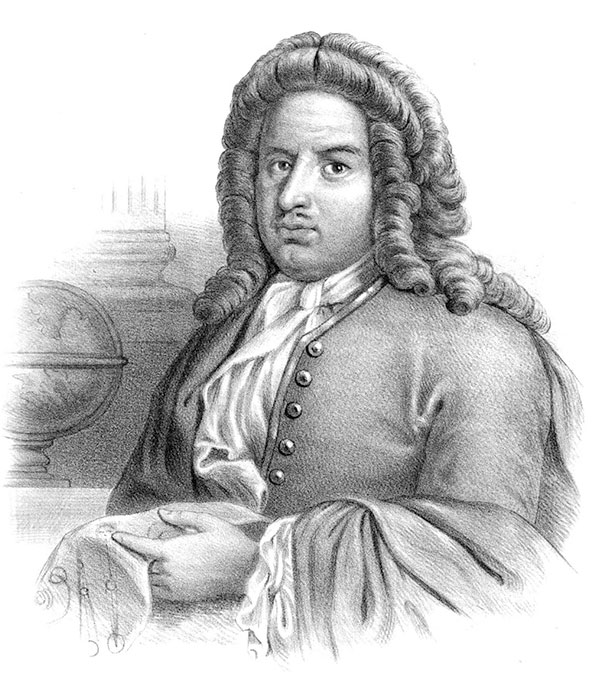
A 19th-century woodcut of Anders Spole

Anders Spole (13 June 1630 – 1 August 1699) was a Swedish mathematician and astronomer. He was born at a farm in Målen, the son of blacksmith Per Andersson and his wife Gunilla Persdotter. At the age of twelve he started studying at Jönköpings skola and was sent to the University of Greifswald in 1652. After three years of studies he continued at other universities in Prussia and Saxony, until his return to Barnarp in 1655, where he started preaching in the local church. He continued to study mathematics at Uppsala University, while at the same time being a tutor baron Sjöblad's sons. In 1663, he became a master craftsman of fireworks and the arts of navigation. The following year he accompanied the young Sjöblads on their peregrination around Europe.

When he returned in 1667, he was named professor in mathematics at the newly founded Lund University; in 1672 he became the principal of that university. He retained this position until 1676 when the university was dissolved because of the Scanian War. During this war he fought on the Swedish side, and he held ground at the fortress in Jönköping. He fought at the Battle of Landskrona in 1677.

In 1679, he took up a professorship in astronomy at Uppsala University, and built an astronomical observatory in his home in central Uppsala. The building, along with all his instruments, was destroyed in the large city fire in Uppsala in 1702. In 1695, by the order of King Karl XI, he travelled to Torneå and Kengis together with Johannes Bilberg to study the midnight sun.

Spole married Martha Lindelius, a distant relative of Carl von Linné, in 1669. Spole's sons were knighted in 1715 for their conduct during the war. His grandson Anders Celsius was an astronomer who invented a temperature scale where 100 originally represented the freezing point of water and 0 represented the boiling point. In 1744 the scale was reversed to create the centigrade scale, renamed in 1948 to the Celsius scale in use today.
