= Daniel Heinsius =

Dutch scholar and poet (1580-1655)

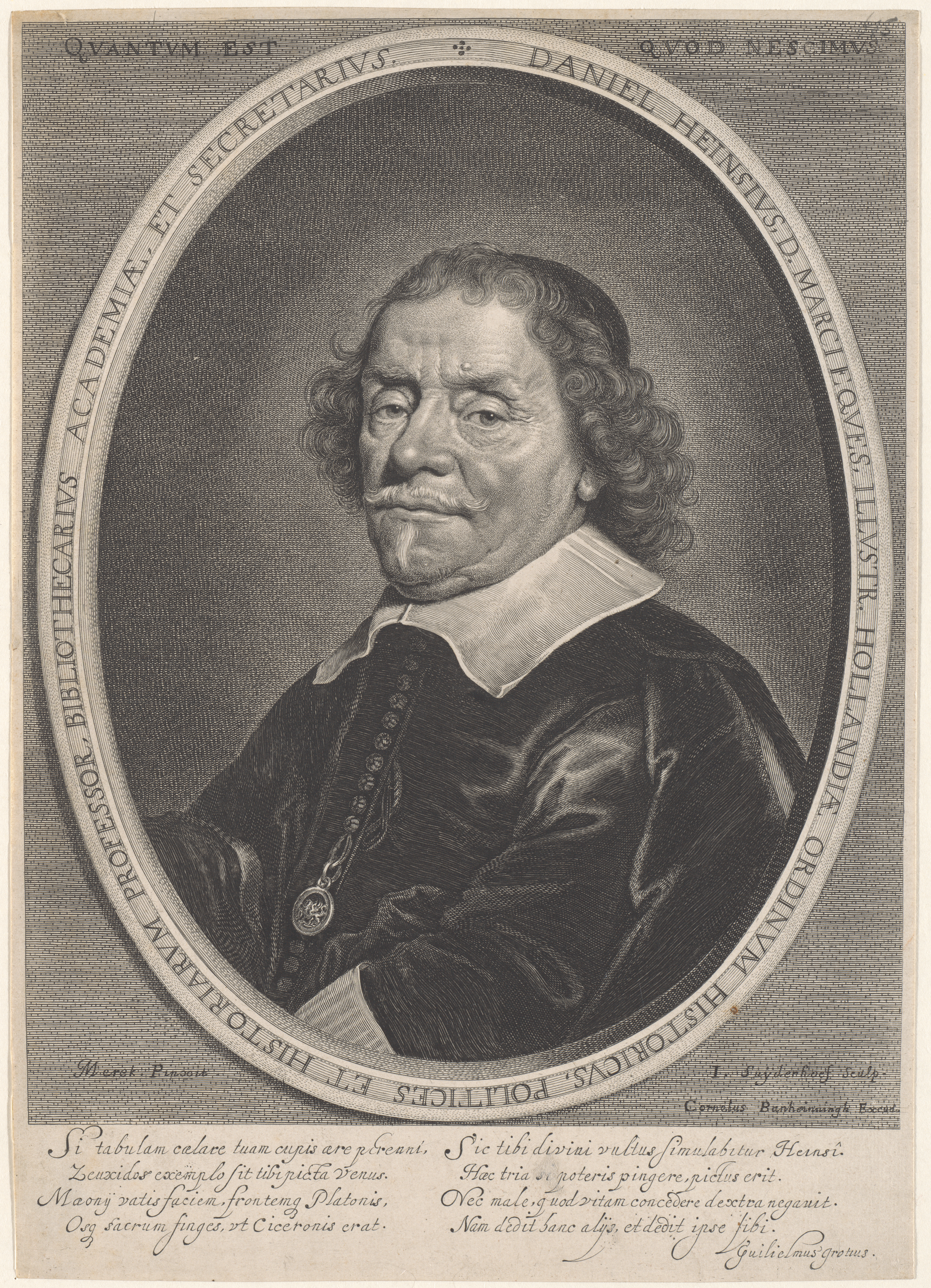
- Born: 9 June 1580; Ghent
- Died: 25 February 1655 (aged 74); The Hague

Academic background
- Education: University of Franeker

Academic work
- Era: Dutch Renaissance
- Discipline: Classical languages poetics political science
- Institutions: Leiden University
- Notable works: De tragica constitutione

Daniel Heinsius (or Heins) (9 June 1580 – 25 February 1655) was one of the most famous scholars of the Dutch Renaissance.

== Youth and student years ==
Heinsius was born in Ghent. The troubles of the Spanish war drove his parents to settle first at Veere in Zeeland, then to England, next at Rijswijk and lastly at Vlissingen. In 1596, being already remarkable for his attainments, he was sent to the University of Franeker to study law under Henricus Schotanus. In 1598, he settled at Leiden for the nearly sixty remaining years of his life. There he studied under Joseph Scaliger, and there he met Marnix de St Aldegonde, Janus Dousa, Paulus Merula, Hugo Grotius and others; he was soon taken into the society of these celebrated men as their equal.

== Professor at Leiden University ==
His proficiency in the classical languages won the praise of all the best scholars of Europe, and offers were made to him, but in vain, to accept honourable positions outside Holland. He soon rose in dignity at the University of Leiden. In 1602, he started lecturing, in 1603 he was appointed professor of poetics, in 1605 professor of Greek, and at the death of Merula in 1607 he succeeded that illustrious scholar as the 4th librarian of Leiden University Library. In 1612, he was appointed as 'Professor Politices', the world's first chair in political science. Through his ties with Naudé and others of the circle of De Thou then enjoying Papal favour, Heinsius began corresponding with Barberini’s protégés Giovanni Battista Doni, Professor of Greek at Florence, Bartolomeo Tortoletti, the poet and theologian, Baldassarre Bonifacio, honoured for his learning both in Rome and Venice, and Lucas Holstenius, a former student of Heinsius’ at Leiden, now in the Cardinal’s service. Pope Urban VIII made him great offers if he would settle at Rome, but he preferred remaining at Leiden.

As a classical scholar Heinsius edited many Latin and Greek classical as well as patristic authors, amongst others: Hesiod (1603), Theocritus, Bion of Smyrna and Moschus (1603), Aristotle's Ars poetica (1611), Publius Ovidius Naso's Metamorphoses, Clement of Alexandria (1616) and Terentius (1618). He brought out the Epistles of Joseph Scaliger in 1627.

Especially influential was his treatise De tragica constitutione ("How to make a tragedy", 1611). It was a personal and easily accessible version of what Aristotle had written on tragedy in his Poetics. A revised edition appeared in 1643 with a slightly different title: De constitutione tragoediae.

In 1609, he printed a first edition of his Latin orations. Ever more voluminous new editions appeared until the final edition of 1642 which comprised 35 orations. The collection ended with the ironical Laus pediculi ("In praise of the louse"), which was translated in English by James Guitard in 1634.

== Latin and Greek poetry ==
Heinsius first drew attention to himself as a Latin poet with his Senecan tragedy Auriacus, sive libertas saucia ("William of Orange, or Freedom Wounded"). In 1607/08, he wrote another tragedy, Herodes infanticida ("The Massacre of the Innocents"), which was published only in 1632. He was, however, especially prolific in writing elegies, of which a large part was dedicated to his love for a girl called Rossa. A first collection appeared in 1603. Ever larger and revised collections of his Poemata, also containing other genres, saw the light regularly. In 1613 he published a collection of New Ancient Greek epigramms by the name Peplus Graecorum epigrammatum. By 1628 he had contributed a Latin poem praising the renowned fencer Gerard Thibault to the front of his book Academie de L'espee.

== Dutch poetry ==
In 1601, he published, under the pseudonym of Theocritus à Ganda ("Theocritus from Ghent"), Quaeris quid sit Amor...? ("Do you ask what love is?"), the first emblem book in Dutch. It was re-edited in 1606/07 with the title Emblemata amatoria ("Love emblems"). A second emblem book, Spiegel vande doorluchtige vrouwen ("Mirror of illustrious women"), was published in 1606. Heinsius also experimented in Dutch poetry after classical models. His efforts were collected by his friend Petrus Scriverius and published as Nederduytsche poemata ("Dutch poems") in 1616. They were greatly admired by Martin Opitz, who, in translating the poetry of Heinsius, introduced the German public to the use of the rhyming alexandrine.

== Later years ==
In 1617, he married Ermgard Rutgers, sister of Janus Rutgersius, one of Scaliger's favorite pupils. They had two children: Nicolas (1620), who was to become a famous Latin poet and book collector, and Elizabeth (1623). At the Synod of Dort (1618-1619), Heinsius was secretary on behalf of the States General. Afterwards, he paid more attention to theology and worked on the text of the Greek New Testament for Elzevier's edition (1624, 1633). In these years, he also wrote a large didactic poem, De contemptu mortis ("On the contempt of death", 1621), which has a Christian-Stoical content. His wife died in 1633, and Heinsius got into a conflict with Claudius Salmasius, who was appointed as his colleague in 1631. He became more and more lonely and embittered. He stopped lecturing in 1647. He died in The Hague, aged 74, and was buried in Leiden.

He collected some Greek manuscripts, e.g. codex 155.

== See also ==
- List of people from Ghent
