= Astronautilia =

Poetry book by Jan Křesadlo

Ἀστροναυτιλία / Hvězdoplavba
- Author: Ἰωάννης Πυρεῖα i.e. Jan Křesadlo
- Original title: Ποιητοῦ ἀδήλου ἈΣΤΡΟΝΑΥΤΙΛΙΑ ἢ ἡ Μικροδυσσεία ἡ κοσμική
- Translator: Jan Křesadlo
- Language: Greek, Czech, Latin, English
- Genre: epic poem, hexameter, Science fiction, satire, poetry, postmodern
- Publisher: Ivo Železný
- Publication date: 1995
- Publication place: Czech literature
- Media type: Print (hardcover)
- Pages: 542
- ISBN: 8023724525

The Astronautilia (Czech: Hvězdoplavba; full title in Greek: Ποιητοῦ ἀδήλου ΑΣΤΡΟΝΑΥΤΙΛΙΑ ἢ ἡ Μικροοδυσσεία ἡ κοσμική; i.e. "An unknown poet's Starvoyage, or the Cosmic Micro-Odyssey") is the New Ancient Greek magnum opus of Czech poet and writer Jan Křesadlo, written in 1994 under the hellenised pseudonym Ἰωάννης Πυρεῖα. One of the most unusual works of twentieth-century literature, it was published shortly after his death as a commemorative first edition.

A full translation into English prose by Ace Rockman was made publicly available in November 2025. Previously only a sample chapter translation was available online. A German translation of the fully transcribed and annotated Greek text is in preparation.

== Genre ==
Aside from the science fiction and epic poem aspects, the postmodern playfulness of the plot itself is underlined by the Czech language Prologue (see part translation) in Karel Čapek's mystification style. Jan Křesadlo purports to have come into the whole process not as the author, but as a translator of the Greek original "by an unknown author." We are to believe this is a real travelogue, whose alleged author is a space-time travelling Captain Oudeis / Nemo, (as confirmed by "copyright Nemo" for the Greek text edition.) Oudeis' travelogue was dictated to his universal translator Franta (which is a creature resembling a skunk, but made entirely of brain tissue.) Franta, who lacked common sense, thought it wise to write it all down in Homeric Greek, so as to make it more famous. At least, that is the claim made to Křesadlo by the 'archivist Divíšek' (a reference to Čapek's character of the same name) who brings the Greek text to Křesadlo for translation. (Albeit Křesadlo supposes that Divíšek wrote it himself.)

The text begins with a Latin summary for the erudite non-Czech reader. Greek neologisms are explained in a Greek-English glossary.

== Contents ==
1. Preface
2. Epistola ad lectorem doctum
3. Synopsis brevior
4. Prologue

The plot is divided according to the Greek alphabet into 24 books, each typically a standalone tale on some planet akin to the television series Star Trek, which are summarised below.

This is followed by:

1. Comment on the finished translation (poem in Czech)
2. Greek-English Glossary of unusual words
3. Τὸ τοῦ ἔπους εὑρητήριον (Greek index)

== Plot synopsis ==
The work is an epic poem, comprising 6,576 verses of hexameter in Homeric Greek, with parallel translation into Czech hexameter. The postmodern science fiction story is inspired by the philosophical postulate of quantum physics, that for something to exist it must be observed. The cosmos-observing creature turns out to be a certain sheep. To kill the sheep would mean the end of everything. The cosmos-observing sheep is kidnapped by a villain called Mandys and pursued by a rapid reaction commando force, whose captain is called Oudeis (Οὐδείς, "Nobody"), following the example of Captain Nemo (Νήμω καπιτᾶνος), as well as the Odyssey's original hero, Odysseus, who went by the name Outis (Οὖτις, "Noman, Nobody"), to fool the Cyclops Polyphemus.

=== Book 1 – Proem. About the cosmos-observing sheep and about Mandys. The beginning of the Astronautilia. (214 lines) ===
After the proem, Oudeis introduces himself and explains how the cosmos exists only because it is observed by the cosmos-observing sheep; he recounts how this sheep was discovered. If the sheep were to be killed, the cosmos would cease to exist. A guard was established for the sheep under Oudeis' charge. One of the guardians, Mandys, steals away the sheep in a spaceship and Oudeis, blamed for this, is tasked with travelling the cosmos with a crew to recover the sheep. He is given phasers, a universal translator called Franta (who resembles a skunk made of brain matter), a robot called Tonda skilled in electronics, a human doctor called Elephas, and a spaceship called Tolma.

=== Book 2 – About the Lesbians. (342 lines) ===
Oudeis and his companions land on a planet and he sends out two men, who find a city of Lesbians. They torture the scouts to death and, discovering the spaceship, melodiously sing to the Oudeis' crew to lure them outside. They lead them to their city as prisoners to cage them. Two more men are tortured and night falls. The next day a crowd takes out another two, but a violent revolution breaks out among the women; one approaches the Queen and, pulling out a penis, rapes her. The other rebel women follow suit. They release Oudeis and his men, and the Queen asks who they are: Oudeis explains their mission and thanks the women for saving them – the Queen tells Oudeis to return the following evening for a banquet where their story will be explained. Sleeping in their ship, Oudeis and his companions return, and the Queen, Tethis, explains that they were tasked to destroy the Lesbians. They lived in secret amongst them and raised a generation of men to use in rebellion – they rejoice now to have succeeded and won their freedom. Oudeis and his men finish the feast and fly into the cosmos.

=== Book 3 – About the Bearers of Beaks. (271 lines) ===
Oudeis and his companions land on a planet and are met by creatures with human bodies but crow heads, and who invite them to their city. It is poorly built, and they provide disgusting food and drink. One of the priests addresses their fellows, announcing that they must consult their Great Light (their sun), a speech Franta secretly translates. The Bearers of Beaks bring them to a hydraulic computer, where the priest declares they must kill Oudeis and his men because they are ungodly; they begin an attack, and Oudeis and crew try to defend themselves but becomes overwhelmed. A flock of winged creatures resembling the Beaked Ones flies down and saves the men, carrying them to their own city. Their king explains that the hydraulic device was designed to govern their lives, but, blocked with seaweed, it broke, demanding them do evil and split their society in two. Asked to make repairs, Oudeis sends his technician Burda, who does so. Oudeis and crew board the spaceship and fly into the cosmos.

=== Book 4 – About the zoophytes. (135 lines) ===
Oudeis and his companions land on a planet inhabited by animals that resemble plants, and explains the chemical structure of their chlorophyll. Their planet seems peaceful, but one of the locals attacks and injures a crewmate. The men flee to their ship and begsto leave, but Oudeis with two others goes back out and discovers that short supply of water on the planet makes the creatures hostile. Oudeis digs a hole with his phaser to release large supplies of water, then boards his spaceship and flies into the cosmos.

=== Book 5 – About the Degenerates. (433 lines) ===
Oudeis and his companions land on a planet with aliens resembling humans. They meet the king, Rx-Phrx-Prx, who gladly receives and sends them to bathe. Once Oudeis and his men have entered the pools, two doctors arrive and speak with Oudeis through Franta, saying Rx-Phrx-Prx sent them to check on their health. The men exit the pool to be examined; Franta secretly translates the doctors, who excitedly admire their physique. They tell the men to dress, who unnervingly discover their phasers are gone. The crew feasts with the Rx-Phrx-Prx: he tells them their civilisation was long ago mutated with nuclear radiation, and they need the crew to marry their daughters for their DNA. They are forcibly married, Oudeis wedding Grgla, Rx-Phrx-Prx's daughter. Oudeis takes her to their bedchambers, but Grgla's shucks her skin and reveals her monstrosity. In fear Oudeis strikes her – she calls for her father who imprisons Oudeis. The next morning two judges arrive and through Franta tell Oudeis he will be tried for his life in two hours. They leave, but using Franta's bioradiophone Oudeis orders the ship computer Caesar to dispatch the RoboCop Ivo in two hours. Once he has been taken to the courtroom, where Rx-Phrx-Prx, Grgla, and the companions are seated, Ivo bursts in and disintegrates the judge. Oudeis demands his phasers back, and announces he and his men will leave the planet, but will donate their sperm for future generations. Having done so, they board the spaceship and fly into the cosmos.

=== Book 6 – About the binary planet and remaining things. (380 lines) ===
Oudeis and his companions arrive in a star system in which two planets are joined by a bar, resembling a dumbbell. They land on one of the planets and are attacked by bipedal dogs, who, about to destroy the ship, are attacked by a race of cats. As the men watch, the ground yields and the ship tips inside the planet, which is hollow. A friendly group of men wearing bagpipes on their backs move towards the ship, asking them to join them for a feast, meeting the King and eating in zero-gravity. The King explains that two races of men, having made peace, built the bar to unite the two worlds and set the dogs and cats against each other for entertainment, but they rebelled and drove them inside the planet. If they find peace, the men will be exterminated – a dog prophet, Au-Bau-Gau, is mediating one, and the king asks Oudeis to kill him. Oudeis sends Ivo. Their lifestyle is hedonistic and compared to twentieth-century hippies. Meanwhile, the dogs and cats have assembled, but before Ivo can shoot Au-Bau-Gau, the dogs call him a traitor and kill him – they fight cats. Oudeis recalls Ivo and receives treasure. He tries to get his men to leave the planet, but they refuse; once asleep, Oudeis slips them back onto the ship and leaves.

=== Book 7 – About the kosmobionts. Oudeis' aristeia. (247 lines) ===
The men wake up in the middle of the cosmos and mutiny under the direction of the crewmate Kypta, steering the ship back to the planet. The ship is immobilised by a kosmobiont – a creature, Oudeis explains, that lives in the cosmos and feeds on each other. It bores its proboscis into the ship. The crew begs Oudeis for help; he sends out Ivo, but the creature strikes it into the cosmos. Oudeis sends out Kypta, but he is also cast into the cosmos. The crew then make Oudeis go out, who takes a jetpack, and struck out three times he dissolves the kosmobiont with his phaser on the fourth. He tells the crew to wait while he goes to recover Ivo and Kypta. Meanwhile, they vote to abandon him and steer away. Oudeis finds Ivo and Kypta and moves back to the ship, but, and finds it attacked by another kosmobiont that he kills. The men praise Oudeis, and reinstate him as admiral.

=== Book 8 – About the butterflies and Grogals and about the prophet. (300 lines) ===
Oudeis and his companions find a star system with a tidally locked planet: along its narrow belt between the two hemispheres he lands. Life flourishes there, including a race of butterflies. They ask Oudeis why he has come, and he explains his mission. The butterflies tell him, should he help them first, they will help him track Mandys: they ask Oudeis to keep back the Grogals who attack the butterflies from the dark side of the world. Oudeis and crew meet the Grogals, who resemble the dog of Dulux commercials, but are bipedal and carry spears and bows. Oudeis repulses them with phasers. He has Burda and Tonda to build an organic wall demarcating the cold hemisphere of the planet. The butterflies rejoice and tell Oudeis that one of the planet's four moons contains a Grogal prophet buried in the ice who help Oudeis. Flying to the moon, the men dig him out of the ice and, attaching electrodes to his head, shock him awake. After some complaint, and Oudeis' request, the prophet tells Oudeis he will find Mandys and the sheep on dung and gold, but not until he has a time-cutter. He refuses to say any more, so Oudeis and crew board their ship and fly into the cosmos.

=== Book 9 – About the Tailed Women and Fake-Dogs. (378 lines) ===
Oudeis and his companions land on a planet and send out three scouts who do not return. Oudeis and Franta head out and see a city, but fall into a valley. Aliens resembling women with tails and long ears arrive and say they should bring them to the Queen. Taking Oudeis, they strip and collar him, making him walk on all fours. A woman remarks they should not offer an inexperienced dog, so they have sex with Oudeis until twilight. Leading them to the city, they throw them into kennels with creatures resembling men, with smaller heads, long ears, and tails. Refusing dog food, Oudeis sleeps. Once they are washed the next day, a woman takes them to the Queen, who picks Oudeis while her companion takes Franta. The Queen, treating Oudeis like a dog, calls for and whips him; Oudeis takes the whip and spanks the Queen, which she enjoys, and they have sex. Afterwards, Oudeis indicates for Franta, who the Queen summons. She explains that long ago the women were split between the Lesbians and men-lovers, and by lot the Lesbians left the planet; a Y chromosome mutation made the men degenerate into dogs, but the women keep them as bedfellows. She begs Oudeis stay to bear intelligent children. They have sex again, and Oudeis wakes to find his companions around him (summoned by Franta) and the three scouts discovered in stables. Oudeis and his men leave their sperm; they board the ship and fly into the cosmos.

=== Book 10 – About the Macropodes and the capture and escape of Mandys. (186 lines) ===
Oudeis and his companions arrive on a planet of the Macropodes who shepherd flocks of sheep. They offer the men fermented sheep's milk, explaining they believe in the cosmos-observer, and recently had a human, matching Mandys' description, come and leave a sheep. Oudeis and crew stay on the planet and wait for Mandys, announced by the noise of his spaceship. Mandys disembarks, pulls down his trousers, and penetrates a sheep – he stole the cosmos-observer away not to destroy it, Oudeis realises, but he loves it. The men seize and chain him in a cave, celebrating with the fermented milk, and fall asleep. They are woken by Mandys' ship leaving: the Macropodes released him. The crew boards Tolma and chase Mandys in the cosmos for nine days, and on the tenth, passing by a planet, are intercepted by the locals and forced to land.

=== Book 11 – About the unmarried men and remaining things. (302 lines) ===
Oudeis and his companions are led in chains to a city whose king asks who they are. Oudeis explains their mission and the sheep, saying they were about to capture Mandys. The king orders them freed and offers his help, summoning a feast. Once they are all drunk, the King bids the servants to bring in some objects resembling animal skins: they are inflated into blow-up dolls that resemble women, with which locals and humans alike have sex and fall asleep. Oudeis stirs the next day and finds the King already awake. Through Franta he asks the king why there are no women on the planet. The king explains that a ship landed on their world carrying Lesbian women who the men, when they realised their intentions, killed; a fear of their own women developed, who degenerated to the point of speechlessness and were wiped out in a plague, so the men built the dolls as substitute. Oudeis tells the king about the Tailed Women, that he believes he knew where the Lesbians came from, and that the remaining Tailed Women would be happy to unite with their men. The king rejoices, ordering preparations be made. Oudeis and men aboard Tolma lead a fleet to the planet of the Tailed Women, and, landing, approach their city.

=== Book 12 – The battle of the men and women. Oudeis as prisoner and gladiator. The aristeia of the robots. The injustice of the king. (473 lines) ===
The army approaches the city and the women fire: the robots, including Ivo, march forward and begin to disintegrate them, but are badly damaged. The city walls are destroyed, and the men enter. The women throw down their arms and strip off their clothes – the men move forward to have sex with them. Oudeis finds the Queen who is already with the King and he accosts him; the King unintelligibly retorts and they square off until the Queen signals she desires them both. Everyone sleeps together. Women riding on dragons fly in and carry everyone off, naked and unarmed, to the mountain city. The women are led off while the men cast in a pit, where they are kept for a month until a ladder is let down. Ten are taken, including Oudeis, and lead to an amphitheatre. Underground, the men are cleaned, armed, and brought into the stadium. Women sit in the stalls and watch as ten Fake-Dogs enter, larger and tusked. Oudeis battles with one and is about to be killed when Tolma flies down and disintegrates it. Franta through a megaphone demands the queen, four others, and the men board. Franta explains it had the ship computer Caesar send Tonda to repair Ivo. They interrogate the Queen, who explains she left their former city for the mountains and bred their Fake-Dogs to be aggressive for sport, which they decided to set on the men for entertainment. The Queen and four others are exchanged for the captured women and men. They marry in a ceremony. Oudeis asks the king for the help he promised, and is refused because he has a wife and Oudeis slept with her. Oudeis insults the king and says he will seek glory. He and his men board the ship and fly into the cosmos.

=== Book 13 – About various creatures on planets. (378 lines) ===
Oudeis and his men land on a planet of the Tripodes who rule four-footed grazers; their blood the Tripodes drink for everlasting life, offering some, but upon being refused attack the crew. They flee into the cosmos and come to a cold planet where creatures live, the more eyes the nobler; it is too cold for a sheep, so they leave. The ship lands on a barren planet populated by ghosts, blessed because they lack need, and inviting the tempted men to join them, but the robots force them back onto the ship. They land on a planet where goat-like creatures live: the males are intelligent but the females tame and milked by the males; finding no sheep, the crew leaves the planet. They land on another whose air is toxic and see a lone man walking it in a space-suit, who Oudeis approaches, and Franta, finding the right language, asks to board their ship and what happened to his world. The stranger explains his planet once had a system in which everything was communal but the commanders possessed private property and the people suffered; a revolution brought democracy, and everything was privatised to the point air, polluted by industry, was commodified and all his race was destroyed but him. He returns to his planet, awing the crew.

Oudeis and his men land on a planet populated by three-eyed Tetrapods. They reveal their holy idol, given by the gods; whoever understands it shall be blessed, but whoever cannot must be killed, so none of their race examine it – Oudeis and his men are heaven-sent gods and can study it. They see nothing, but Burda discovers the central eye of the aliens is blind, so has the robot Tonda study the image with three eyes, and discerns an eagle flying over a village, fish in claw. Oudeis orders Tonda build the same image visible to two eyes, and the creatures rejoice. The crew arrives on another planet covered in fat, long strong poles pushing through, and lice the size of foals pepper the surface, one of which a crewmate blasts and out the hole spurts blood. They realise the planet is one great creature and flee in fear. The men land on a planet covered in terrifying monsters. One addresses Oudeis in his own language, saying he was the monster that lived in Oudeis' bedroom when he was a child. Oudeis asks how he can exist, saying he must be a vision. The monster, enraged, tells him sleeping and waking are the same thing and stalks off; the others join him. The men board the ship and fly into the cosmos.

=== Book 14 – The Astronauts' Council. The Recreational Planet. Kypta's wickedness and persecution. (351 lines) ===
Now that the crew have been travelling for five years, Oudeis calls a council to say they can either return to Earth and be imprisoned, leaving the cosmos in threat, or aimlessly continue as they are. He suggests instead they return to the Grogal prophet and ask him to explain his prophecy. Kypta calls Oudeis a fool and argues for sailing to the planet Utopia. Oudeis explains how the etymology of Utopia proves the planet does not exist and the crewmates laugh at Kypta. Oudeis nevertheless agrees the crew need a break and suggests journeying to a nearby planet to relax before chasing after the prophet, which the crew agrees to. They arrive on a natural, idyllic planet, where the nymphs rise out of the sea with whom they have sex. They relax on the planet for a while, until one day thunder sounds and Oudeis sees a small skiff of Tolma flying away. He calls his companions and they board, discovering Kypta has stolen the treasure given in Book 6. They chase Kypta for nine days, finding him on the tenth. He drives past pulsars, whose radiowaves interfere with Tolma's sensors. A ship robot calculates a path around the magnetic field but Oudeis sails through and, to stop the ship exploding, opens an auxiliary jet, casting them deep into the cosmos. Kypta is caught by the gravity of the pulsar and crushed. The crew bewails the loss of their loot.

=== Book 15 – About the royal daughter, the monster, and the good saviour in the archetypal schemes. (340 lines) ===
Oudeis and his companions reverse the ship's engines to gradually slow the ship, landing on the first planet they see, whose gravity is weaker than Earth's. Oudeis and four men explore and find a city of men smaller than humans; they return, and Oudeis, Franta, and Ivo head out. Oudeis asks a man he finds why he weeps; he explains the king's daughter will be sacrificed to the monster Gr-gr-gros and leads them to the palace. They find the king lamenting his daughter, and Oudeis tells him he can kill the monster. The king does not believe him, and outlines a race of pygmy men and the phlegms they made that can turn into any shape and choke men, and how they made Gr-rg-ros (whose spelling is inconstant). Oudeis obliterates a bird with his phaser: the king rejoices, calling his daughter, and Oudeis repeats himself. The men return to the ship. The following morning Oudeis and crew, including Ivo and Franta, go to a forum where the girl is bound. The priests lament but call it necessary for the seasons to pass, to Oudeis' utmost disgust. The temple doors open and Grg-rg-gros is released – Oudeis kills it with a phaser. The priest cries that the city is doomed; Oudeis calls him a liar; he says the pygmies will make a new monster so the priests can rule the city. Oudeis annihilates him, and in the tussle the crew are overwhelmed and flee. The men laugh at Oudeis for trying to save the girl; they board the spaceship and flee into the cosmos.

=== Book 16 – The Robots' Rebellion. Franta's madness and restoration. (374 lines) ===
Oudeis is woken by Franta who tells him the robots have revolted and are steering to the planet Rebellion. Franta prevented the other robots killing Oudeis: the other men are in suspended animation, and Oudeis must act like a robot on Rebellion. They arrive, and Franta tells Oudeis it and the ship computer Caesar love each other but Franta has no genitals and Caesar no body. Franta will sell its linguistic talent to pay for Melis (its name for Caesar) to be embodied. One day Franta has Tonda upload the computer into a disk and takes it away; later he returns with canine genitals. Franta sees Melis approaching, but is horrified to see male genitals. Melis calls Franta a fool and says he was always male; Franta tells him he does not love men, and Melis, heartbroken, destroys himself with a phaser. Oudeis asks Franta to return to the disk but Franta wants to try sex with the local creatures on Rebellion. Oudeis finds some robot-hunters and has them catch Franta, who falls into a trap and calls Caesar to summon Ivo. On his return, Franta orders Caesar to wake Burda, who fixes Franta's leg and, upon Franta's request, removes the genitals. Franta convinces Caesar to give up its memory drive, the companions are woken from suspended animation, and the ship sails into the cosmos.

=== Book 17 – About the robbers and the capture of Elephas and Franta. (185 lines) ===
Oudeis and the companions sail in the cosmos when they come upon a ship that speaks to them in English and says one of their sailors are sick, begging them send one. Oudeis sends the doctor Elephas in a space suit with Franta; the ship, having received them, speeds off, and Franta sends an SOS. Oudeis chases on them and fires despite the rogue vessel threatening to kill Elephas and Franta if he continues. The robbers cover their ship in an electromagnetic cloak, making them invisible, so Oudeis flies by, and they retreat to an asteroid to repair the damage. Large birds living on its surface attack it and pierce the vessel, exposing the robbers to the vacuum, killing them, and destroying the cloak. Franta signals Oudeis, who arrives to save them. Oudeis takes the electromagnetic cloak and sails into the cosmos.

=== Book 18 – About the Grogal temple and the guards. Burda's aristeia. About the parrot-centaurs. (170 lines) ===
Oudeis and his companions arrive on the moon they visited in Book 8 and find a temple on the site of the Grogal prophet besides to a city of aliens that enslave the Grogals but worship the prophet. They enter the temple whose guards are made of energy – they absorb the raybeams, so Burda inverts his phaser and drinks them in. The men find the prophet, discovering from a plaque his name is Onuphrios (Oudeis explains who the Onuphrios of our own world is), and trip an alarm. They steal the corpse and flee on the surface of the planet under attack – one of the Grogals, rushing Oudeis, he knocks out and takes along. They leave from the planet but are chased by spaceships. Oudeis throws out the unconscious Grogal, making the ships to think it Onuphrios; Burda turns on the cloak and they escape with the real Onuphrios.

=== Book 19 – The Oracle of the Grogal Prophet. (225 lines) ===
Oudeis, Burda, Elephas, and Franta take Onuphrios out of their suspended animation, attach the electrodes, and shock him awake again. Oudeis beseeches him to explain his earlier prophecy about the dung, gold, and time-cutter. Because Oudeis saved him from the locals who enslaved his race, he agrees.

There is an asteroid of pure gold, dense enough to support its own atmosphere and populated by sheep whose dung coats the surface – Mandys lives there as a shepherd. He will flee into the past with the cosmos-observing sheep and Oudeis will need to chase him with a time-cutter. Time, Onuphrios explains with an analogy, is like a huge 3D ring with two surfaces, where one is the present, the other the past: one cannot pass one from side to the other without crossing an edge or piercing. Take a ring of paper and cut it, yielding a strip, and joining one end to another so the inside attaches to the outside and vice versa one, achieves a twisted ring mathematicians call a Möbius strip. Only one colour tints its surface; if an ant moved along the Strip it could walk on a single path to cover the whole Strip without crossing an edge, unlike a ring, where two ants on either side could not meet. Time resembles a ring and must be made into a Möbius Strip to travel though it: to do so one requires a time-plotter, which Mandys has.

There are creatures called Time Guardians which prevent the misuse of time travel: only they have time-plotters, one of which Mandys must have stolen and keeps on the asteroid where he mines gold to flee into the past with it and the sheep. If he took the sheep into the past, it cannot observe the cosmos in the future, so it is there destroyed, but Mandys and the sheep are safe in the past with no one from the future extant to stop him. Since Oudeis is compelled to chase after Mandys, he needs this technology, and Onuphrios shows him the route to the Guardians. Were someone to cut a Möbius Strip through its length, there would not be two circles but one circle longer than the other; if a ring was cut it would create two smaller rings, and using this one could save the cosmos: Mandys, isolated in one cosmos, would only destroy only that one, with the other safe. Onuphrios says he has a time-cutter in his stomach and asks to be buried in the cosmos, at which point the putrefaction reaches him and he becomes brain-dead.

Elephas removes the device. They throw his corpse into the cosmos and Oudeis orders the vessel steered towards the Time Guardians.

=== Book 20 – About the other cosmic robbers and strange planets. Especially about the hypnotic animals. (193 lines) ===
Oudeis calls a council and the men agree to the plan. Robbers boom through the speakers, bidding them surrender or resist and die. Oudeis orders the cloak cast but they announce they can penetrate it; he orders the ship's nuclear power increased and it cascades into the cosmos. The crew fires the rockets in reverse and place their position with star maps. They find a binary star system and land on the Tlalochoi planet to draw water, but the Tlalochoi attack and drive them off. On the next planet Oudeis dispatches men who do not return; the sensors find them smiling in a plain, surrounded by cephalopod creatures. In a skiff Oudeis, Franta, and Ivo approach; once they step out, Oudeis sees himself in a house of many nude women. He wakes on the ship with his companions. Franta had called the ship and Ivo killed the creatures, but Oudeis keeps one in a Faraday cage to use its hypnosis. The ship sails on to the Time Guardians.

=== Book 21 – About the Time Guardians. Franta's dexterity and aristeia. (211 lines) ===
Oudeis and the companions arrive in a star system, in which one of the moons bristles with military armaments. He orders four men with Franta board the skiff with the hypnotic creature in a tool. The Guardians tell them to leave, so Oudeis aims the dream device at them, which works and backfires. Oudeis wakes in a prison with Franta and his men under the watch of the Time Guardians. Franta tells Oudeis what happened and that all of Tolma was captured. The Commander of the Time Guardians approaches, asking who they are, suspecting they have come for a time-plotter; Oudeis replies truthfully, explaining the cosmos-observing sheep. The Commander calls it mythical and keeps them trapped, but takes Franta to examine it. Oudeis and his men wail, but suddenly appear on Tolma, where Franta spits out a box. It says the Commander in fact loved it and while he was enraptured Franta stole a time-plotter and used its tongue to go back one day to save them. The ship sails on to find Mandys.

=== Book 22 – The interception and trickery of Mandys. (146 lines) ===
Oudeis and the companions sail in the cosmos but Oudeis decides he no longer wants to keep the hypnotic animal, which the guards will kill tomorrow, so, testing the time-plotter, he makes it move forward one day and vanish. The sensors find an asteroid covered in dung and a flock. A shepherd lives there with a dog's head, who tells Oudeis he is Veles and was built by the engineers who construct all the gods of the cosmos. Oudeis asks him about Mandys, and Veles tells them he came was but driven back by the rams who jealously wanted to mate with the cosmos-observer. Oudeis stays on the asteroid for a short while, and while the other men sleep he goes to the shepherd's cave and sees Veles wears a mask; removing it, he finds Mandys. Oudeis cries for his companions and seizes the man. Oudeis calls a meeting.

=== Book 23 – Mandys’ trick and escape. The Time Guardians’ coming and interference. Oudeis’ and Franta's and Tonda's hunt for Mandys. (170 lines) ===
Oudeis addresses his companions: they will have Mandys identify the sheep, but he asks, afterwards, if they should kill or return him to Earth; the companions choose death. Mandys says he will reveal the goldmine if they release him; the companions agree. He shows them the mine and the cosmos-observing sheep (whose back Oudeis marks), and flies away. The men work to replace Kypta's loss and use Semtex, an explosion of which causes the cosmos-observer to break its neck, but the cosmos is not destroyed. Oudeis takes the corpse to the men. The real cosmos-observer never sleeps, so they can identify it at night; they discover a sheep is missing. Oudeis says they must chase Mandys again, and the Time Guardians arrives. Oudeis tells the men he will board the skiff with Franta, Tonda, and the time-plotter to chase after Mandys to draw the Time Guardians away; they must return home and enjoy life; Burda is appointed admiral. Franta makes the Commander hesitate and it, Oudeis, Tonda, and the time-plotter flee into the cosmos.

=== Book 24 – The capture of Mandys and the sheep. The poem's close and end. (171 lines) ===
Oudeis and his companions sail towards Earth and the sensors detect Mandys. Oudeis radiophones, telling him halt or he will fire; Mandys calls him a fool who could destroy everything. Oudeis fires, the vessel vibrates and vanishes. Oudeis remembers Onuphrios saying that Mandys will flee into the past because of the wealth that gold provides, so he reasons Mandys will go to the twentieth century where he will be rich from his gold and technology sufficiently advanced for comfort. He does so and finds Mandys hurtling towards Earth. Mandys and sheep vacates the ship, as do Oudeis, Franta, and Tonda; they land on Earth unharmed. Oudeis summarises the hunt for Mandys and how they corner him. Mandys puts a knife to the sheep's throat and tells them to back off; Franta radiophones to Oudeis and he darts forward, striking the sheep to the ground and knocking it out, to Mandys' shock. Mandys took the wrong sheep: when the Time Guardians fired on the asteroid, it shook and darkness fell on their eyes for a moment – they realised the cosmos-observer was real, and Oudeis' men radiophoned Franta to report this and say they will collect him in the Tatra Mountains.

Oudeis explains that Mandys remained on Earth in the twentieth century to become a literary critic with the wrong sheep. Franta says it composed this account in the Argive tongue and reported it truthfully. It and Oudeis want to board onto their spaceship and leave, to return to their own Earth, and their own time.

== Extract ==
The Preamble/Prooimion and Oudeis' biography.

Ἀρχόμενος πρῶτον Μουσῶν χορῷ εἰξ Ἑλικῶνος
εὔχομαι ἐκπάγλως καὶ Ἀπόλλωνι ἄνακτι
Μουσάων ἄρχοντι καλῷ ἰδὲ δαίμον' ἀοιδῶν
ὄφρ' εἴποιεν ἐμὴν κόσμου γλαφυροῖο πόρευσιν
[5] θαύματα πλανητῶν καὶ ἀνδρῶν ὄμβριμα ἔργα,
οἷά τε δειξάμενοι πλέομεν δνοφερὸν διὰ χάσμα
πλοίαρχος μὲν ἐγὼ καὶ ἐμοὶ ἐρίηρες ἑταῖροι
Μανδὺν ζητοῦντες καὶ μῆλον κοσμοθεωροῦν.
ἔσπετε νῦν ἡμῖν τάδε, ὦ θεὸς ἠὲ θέαιναι.
[10] Ποῦ ἀρχήν γε λάβοιμι τίδε πρότερον καταλέξω;
Εἰρωτᾷς ὅτις εἰμί τέ μοι κλυτὸν οὔνομα ζητεῖς.
Τοίγαρ ἐγὼ φήσω· ἐπεὶ ἐσσόμενός γε ἱκάνω
οὐχί κεν ἐκφωνεῖν δύνασαις, χαλεπὸν δὲ τόδ' ἐστι.
Ἀλλά γε εἵνεκα σεῖο θέλω ἑτέρως καλέσασθαι.
Οὐδένα πλοίαρχόν περ ἐπίκλησιν κεκαλήσθω
ὥς εἰν βίβλοισιν μυστηρικὸν ἄνδρα καλοῦσι
τολμηρόν· Νήμω καπιτᾶνον Ῥωμαϊστί τε.
Οὕτως μὲν κέλεσον μετατιθεὶς ἤματα πάντα.
Ἀστυνόμος μὲν ἐγὼ ἐν ἐσσυμένῳ πτολιέθρῳ
κοίραμος ἀστυνόμων ἰδὲ καὶ ταγός· μοι δε πίθονατι
πάντες ἀστυνόμοι ἐν Μητροπόλει καλιπύργῳ.
Αὐτάρ μοι λύπη γέγονεν χαλεπὴ δέτε πρῆξις.
Ποῦ δ' ἀρχήν γε λάβοιμι τίδε πρότερον καταλέξω;

Translation:

To begin, first the Muses' choir dwelling on Helikonos
I invoke with all might, as do also the ruler Apollo,
the fine ruler of Muses and also the god of all poets,
let them witness my voyage through the void of the cosmos,
[5] the planet'ry wonders, and also the great deeds of men,
done as we voyaged out there through the black chasm,
myself, the ship's captain, and also my worthy companions,
for Mandys searching and the sheep which watches the cosmos,
tell us of this now, oh god, ye goddesses also!
[10] Where should I start, and what should I speak of first?
You ask who I am, and you search for my famous name?
Well then, I'll tell you: since I come from the future,
you cannot pronounce it, because it's difficult.
But for your sake I want to be called something other.
[15] Oudeis the ship's captain – let that be my name,
like how they call that brave, mysterious man
in books: in Latin, he's Captain Nemo.
In translation so they call me for all days.
[20] I am a warden in a future city,
ruler of wardens and their leader: I'm obeyed by
all the wardens in Metropolis of beautiful towers.
But grief came to me, and a difficult task.
Where should I start, and what should I speak of first?

== See also ==
- http://www.pierluigigatti.eu/wp-content/uploads/2010/01/Programm_Aquilonia_Jena.pdf Stefan Weise (Halle), Der letzte Homeride – Jan Křesadlo und seine Astronautilia (The last Homericist – Jan Křesadlo and his Astronautilia)
- New Ancient Greek – Field of study of the ancient Greek language
