= Maurice Langaskens =

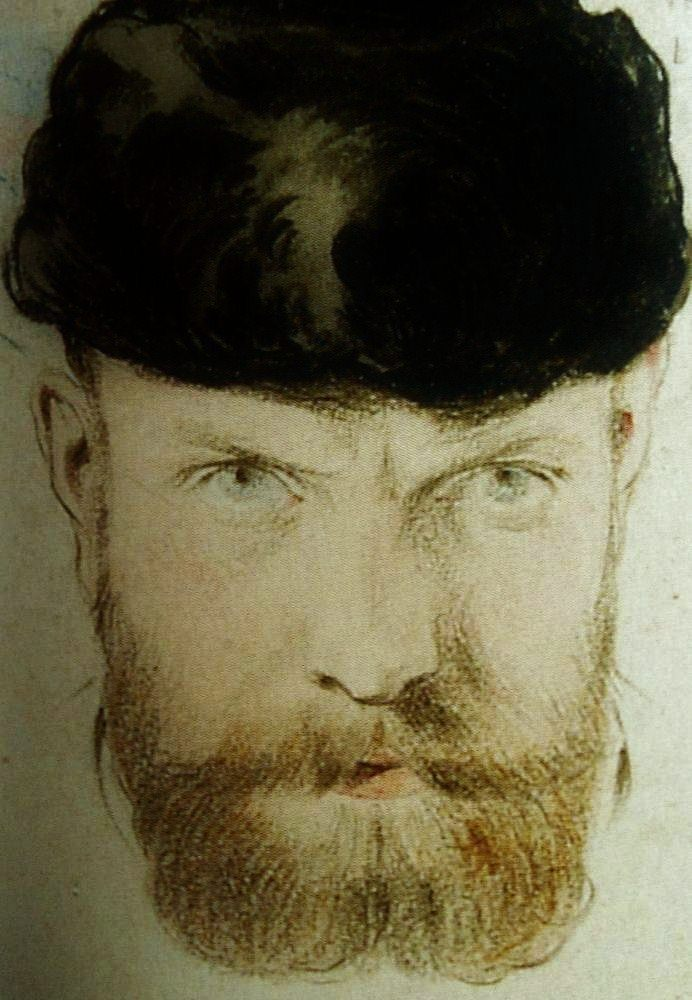
Maurice Langaskens, self-portrait in watercolour.

Maurice Langaskens (born 1884 in Ghent — died 1946 in Schaerbeek) was a Belgian painter. His work was initially of the Art Nouveau style. Langaskens was prisoner of war when he painted his best known work, In Memorium: Burial of a Prisoner of War at the Gottingem Camp.
