= Adrianus Todeschinus =

Captain of the Papal Guard (1471–1546)

- Born: 29 October 1471; Ghent, County of Flanders, Burgundian Netherlands
- Died: 13 May 1546 (aged 74); Rome, Papal State, Italy
- Burial place: Santa Maria dell'Anima, Rome
- Military career
- Allegiance: papacy
- Service years: before 1503–1546
- Commands: captain of the papal guard

Adrianus Todeschinus (1471–1546) was captain of the papal guard under six consecutive popes.

== Life ==
Todeschinus was born in Ghent on 29 October 1471. He became captain of the papal guard under Pope Alexander VI and remained such until his death during the pontificate of Pope Paul III. He wrote a treatise on the art of war, De Castrorum metatione et machinis bellicis commentarius, which has not survived. He died in Rome on 13 May 1546. He had two sons, Paul and Alexander. Paul died in 1555, aged 14. Alexander had a memorial to his father and brother placed in the church of Santa Maria dell'Anima, Rome.
