= Flanders Expo =

Exhibition venue in Ghent, Belgium

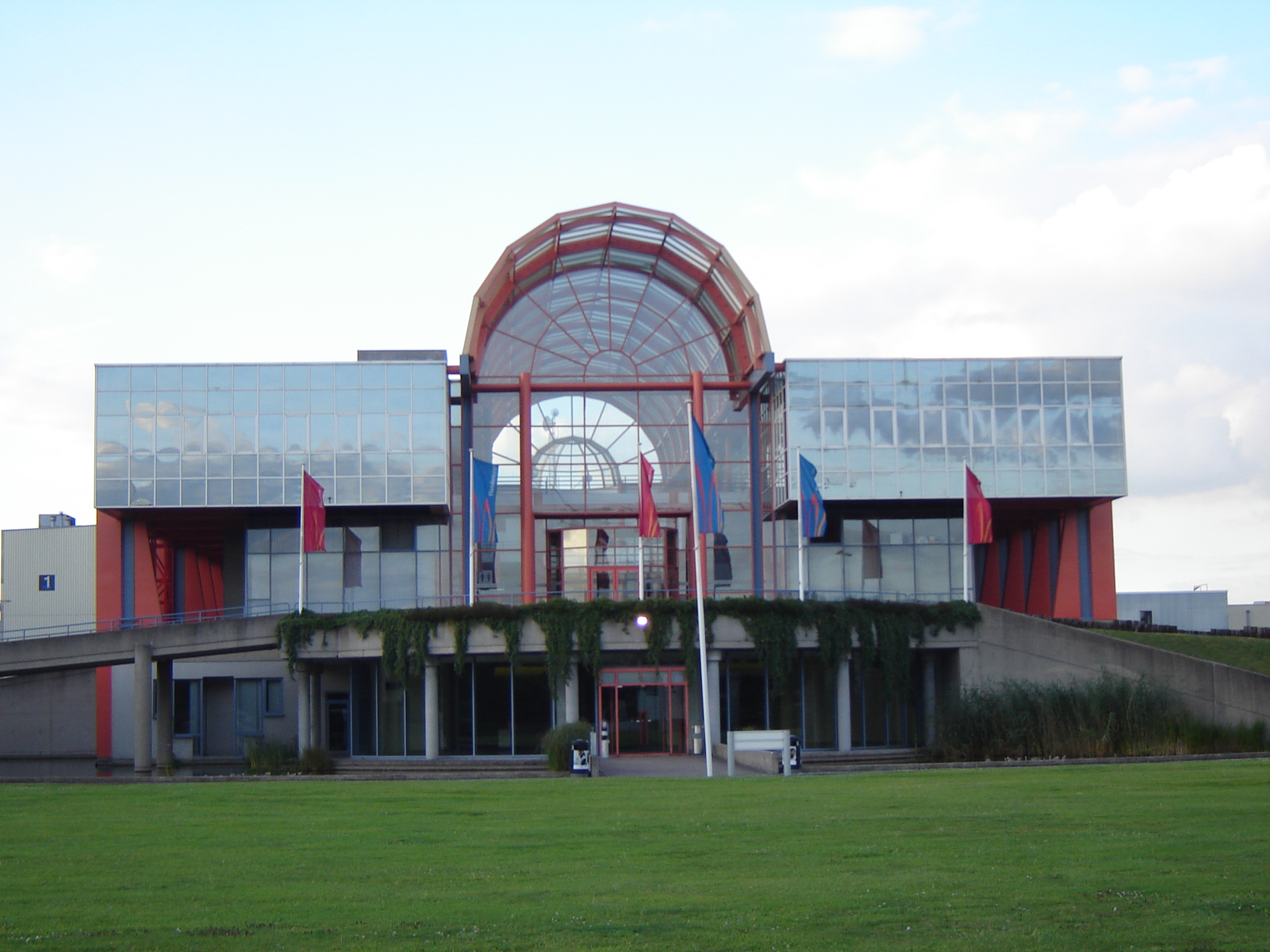
- Entrance building (2008)
- Interactive map of Flanders Expo
- Location: Ghent, Flanders, Belgium
- Coordinates: 51°1′37.48″N 3°41′30.45″E
- Owner: N.V. Flanders Expo
- Operator: N.V. Flanders Expo; Artexis
- Capacity: 13,000 (Hall 8)
- Surface: Versatile
- Acreage: 54,000 m^{2} (combined)

Construction
- Built: 1985–87
- Opened: May 1987

Website
- www.flandersexpo.be

Flanders Expo is a multi-purpose arena and convention center located in Ghent, Flanders, Belgium. Flanders Expo was founded in 1986 and officially opened in May 1987 with the third edition of Flanders Technology International. It serves as a venue to host a large variety of events including concerts, exhibitions, trade fairs and sports. The first CEO was Marc Mortier from 1986 till 2002.

== Building ==
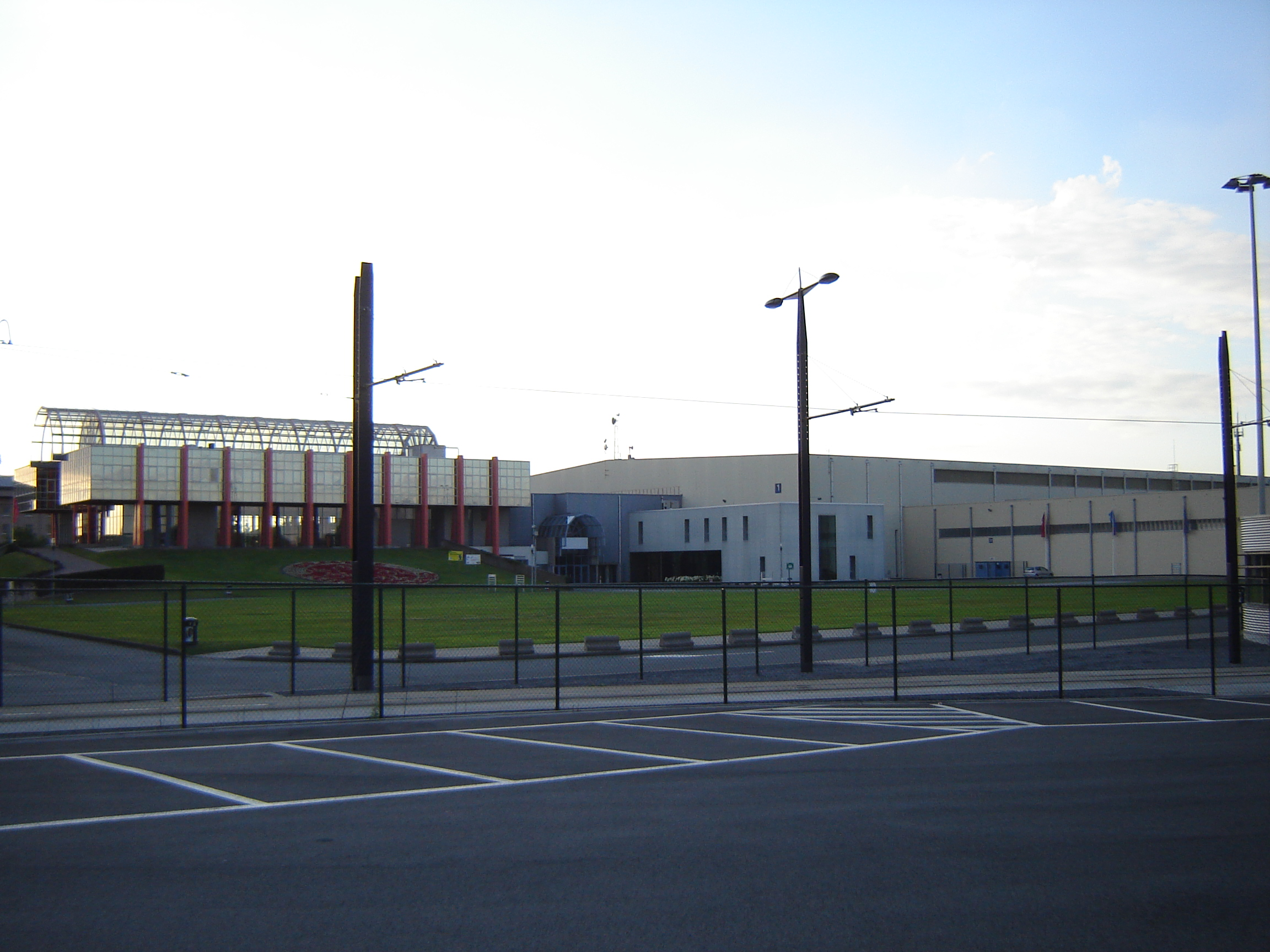
Entrance and halls (2008)

Flanders Expo is the biggest event hall in the Flanders region and the second biggest in Belgium. It is the 40th largest exhibition complex in the world.

The complex consists of eight interconnecting halls, each of which can be used separately, a conference centre and three restaurants. Hall 8's capacity is more than 13,000 people. In the vicinity of the halls, there are 4,000 parking spaces.

=== Halls ===
The central-located flagship hall, Hall 1, is the largest hall and offers an area of 19.152 m^{2}. To the left of this central hall are Halls 2, 4 and 6, on the right are 3, 5 and 7. Each halls are identical and offer 4.032 m^{2} of space.

Hall 8 – a newer, large multi-purpose square hall – has an area of 10.735 m^{2} and a height of 13 meters. The acoustics of the hall is helped by its height and a special sound wall, making it suitable for larger productions such as sporting and musical events. A large room, called the Forum, is located on the first floor with an area of 850 m^{2}.

== History of events ==
=== Concerts ===
Until 2002, a lot of concerts took place in Flanders Expo. Famous artists who have performed in Flanders Expo include Tina Turner (12 times), Celine Dion, Janet Jackson, Simple Minds, Phil Collins, Charles Aznavour, Bryan Adams, Prince, Cher, Elton John, Britney Spears, Backstreet Boys, Paul McCartney, Joe Cocker, Whitney Houston, Barry White, U2, Nick Kamen, Eros Ramazzotti, Bon Jovi, Scorpions, Metallica, AC/DC, Steps etc.

Every year in autumn it is host to the I Love Techno music festival. It is the biggest indoor techno festival in Europe, with 60,000 visitors in one evening.

=== Sport ===
It hosted the 1988 FIBA Champions Cup Final four. The 2015 Davis Cup World Group final between Belgium and Great Britain was held at the Expo.

== See also ==
- List of tennis stadiums by capacity

== Notes ==
Preceded by Patinoire de Malley; Lausanne	FIBA European Champions Cup; Final Four; Venue; 1988	Succeeded by Olympiahalle; Munich
Preceded by Stade Pierre-Mauroy; Lille	Davis Cup; Final Venue; 2015	Succeeded by TBD
