= Leen Ryckaert =

Flemish psychologist and writer

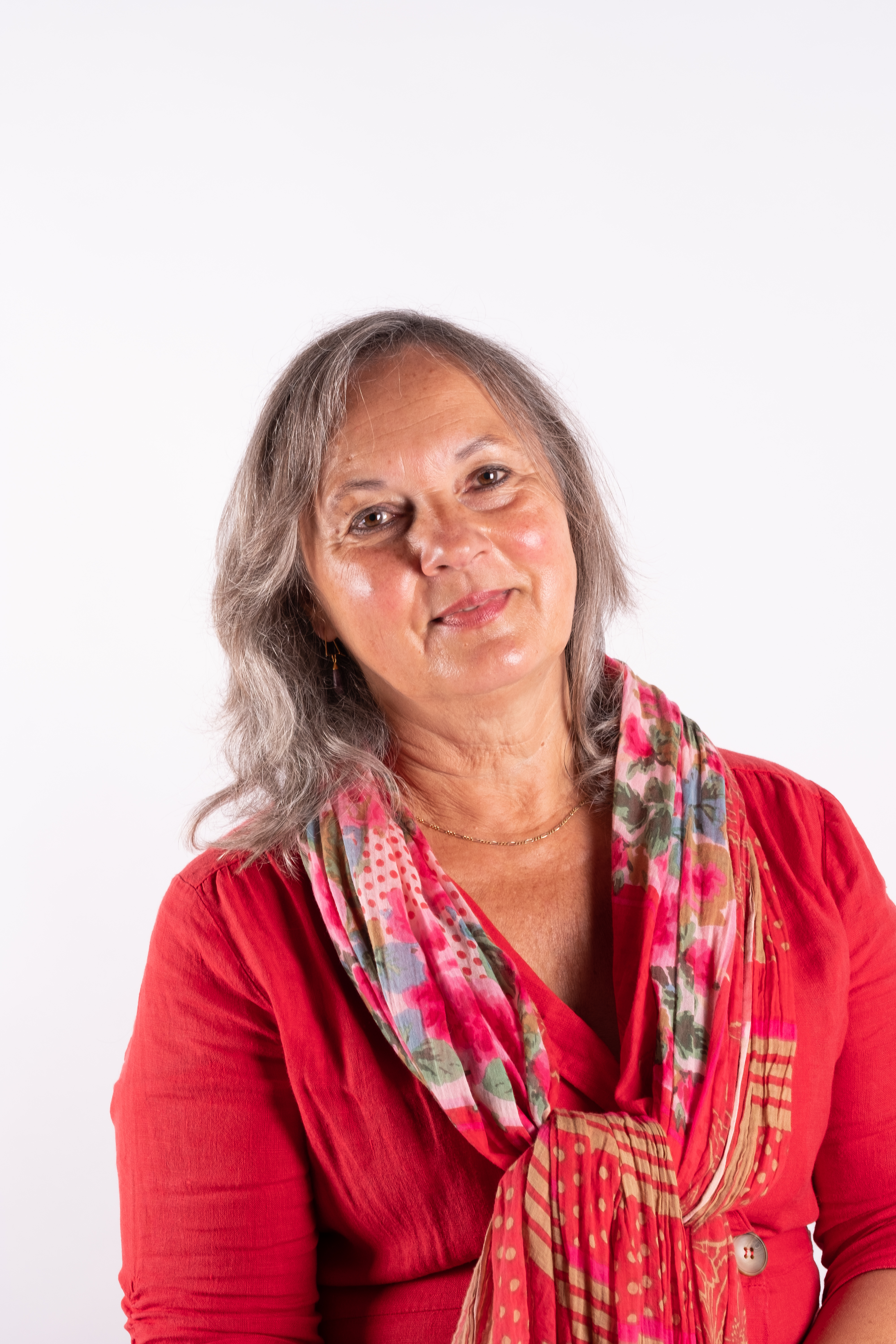
- Leen Ryckaert in 2020
- Born: Magdalena Maria Daniella; 8 November 1957 (age 68); Ghent, Belgium
- Citizenship: Belgian
- Occupations: Psychologist; Author
- Writing career
- Language: Dutch

Leen Ryckaert (born 8 November 1957, in Ghent) is a Flemish psychologist and writer.

== Biography ==
Ryckaert studied psychology and educational sciences at Ghent University. She was scientific assistant at the University of Ghent and psycho-pedagogic consultant at a PMS-centre (now CLB – Centre for Student Coaching). She is now semi-retired as clinical psychologist.

In March 2011, the book Je bent niet jouw gedachten was published. It is a guide for people suffering from occupational burnout and depression (mood) and offers a way to choose for happiness.

In January 2023, the Italian translation of this book Non sei i tuoi pensieri was published by "Gruppo Albatros Il Filo".

Ryckaert is the author of the book Omgaan met Ouders, a handbook for teachers to help them deal in their meetings with parents.

In 1985, Ryckaert published the paper "Kohlberg's cognitive moral development theory. Application to juvenile delinquency" and in 1987 the paper "The control of anger and aggressive behaviour. The role of cognitive factors"

== Works ==
=== Non-fiction ===
- Omgaan met ouders (2005/2006) ISBN 90 209 6018 0 (Third, fully revised edition 2015) ISBN 978 94 014 2652 7
- Je bent niet jouw gedachten (2011) ISBN 978 908 16489 05 (Third, fully revised edition 2020) ISBN 978 90 90 3360 77
- Non sei i tuoi pensieri (2023) ISBN 978 88 30669291
