= Saul Akkemay =

Belgian columnist, publicist

- Born: 14 October 1964 (age 61); Ghent, Belgium
- Other names: Panbello
- Occupations: columnist, publicist

Saul Akkemay (born 14 October 1964), better known by the pen name Panbello, is a Belgian-born freelance publicist and columnist, of German-Jewish paternal descent.

He writes reviews and columns for several magazines, mostly essays on the Jewish contribution to Film Noir.

== Early life ==
Saul Akkemay was born in 1964 in Ghent, the capital of the Belgian province East Flanders, the Dutch-speaking (northern) part of Belgium.

He grew up in a liberal family and attended the Grammar school in his hometown. After his graduation he attended the Ghent University. However, the university was much criticised by Akkemay and he left the faculty Press and Communication Sciences in 1985 without a degree.

== Works ==
- 2003–04 High Heels on a Wet Pavement : the Jewish Contribution to Film Noir (essays);
- 2004 Better Late than Dead (crime novel);
