= Jan Křesadlo =

Czech psychologist (1926–1995)

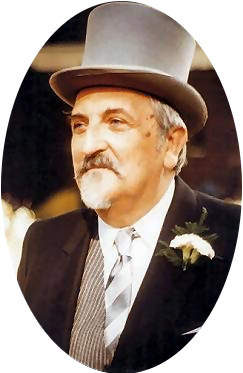
- Born: Václav Jaroslav Karel Pinkava; 9 December 1926; Prague, Czechoslovakia
- Died: 13 August 1995 (aged 68); Colchester, England
- Citizenship: British
- Occupations: Psychologist, writer, poet
- Children: 4

Václav Jaroslav Karel Pinkava (Czech pronunciation: [ˈvaːtslaf ˈjaroslaf ˈkarɛl ˈpɪŋkava]; 9 December 1926 – 13 August 1995), better known by his pen name Jan Křesadlo (pronounced [ˈjan ˈkr̝ɛsadlo]), was a Czech psychologist who was also a prizewinning novelist and poet.

An anti-communist, Pinkava emigrated to Britain with his wife and four children following the 1968 invasion of Czechoslovakia by the Soviet-led armies of the Warsaw pact. He worked as a clinical psychologist until his early retirement in 1982, when he turned to full-time writing. His first novel Mrchopěvci (GraveLarks) was published by Josef Škvorecký's emigre publishing house 68 Publishers, and earned the 1984 Egon Hostovský prize.

He chose his pseudonym (which means firesteel) partly because it contains the uniquely Czech sound ř; in addition, he was fond of creating more pseudonyms such as Jake Rolands (an anagram), J. K. Klement (after his grandfather, for translations into English), Juraj Hron (for his Slovak-Moravian writings), Ferdinand Lučovický z Lučovic a na Suchým dole (for his music), Kamil Troud (for his illustrations), Ἰωάννης Πυρεῖα (for his Astronautilia), and more.

Pinkava was also active in choral music, composing (among others) a Glagolitic Mass. As well, he worked in mathematical logic, discovering the many-valued logic algebra which bears his name.

A polymath and polyglot, Pinkava was fond of setting intense goals for himself, such as translating Jaroslav Seifert's interwoven sonnet cycle about Prague, 'A Wreath of Sonnets'. He published a collection of his own poems in seven languages. Perhaps his most staggering achievement is ΑΣΤΡΟΝΑΥΤΙΛΙΑ Hvězdoplavba, a 6575-line science fiction epic poem, an odyssey in classical Homeric Greek, with its parallel hexameter translation into Czech. This was published shortly after his death, in a limited edition. (ISBN 80-237-2452-5) Only his first, prize-winning novel has been published in English translation, as GraveLarks in a bilingual edition in 1999 (ISBN 9788086013817) and in a revised edition in 2015 (ISBN 9780993377303)

He is the father of film director Jan Pinkava who received an Oscar for Geri's Game in 1998 and also illustrated GraveLarks.
