= Johannes Bilberg =

Swedish theologian (1646–1717)

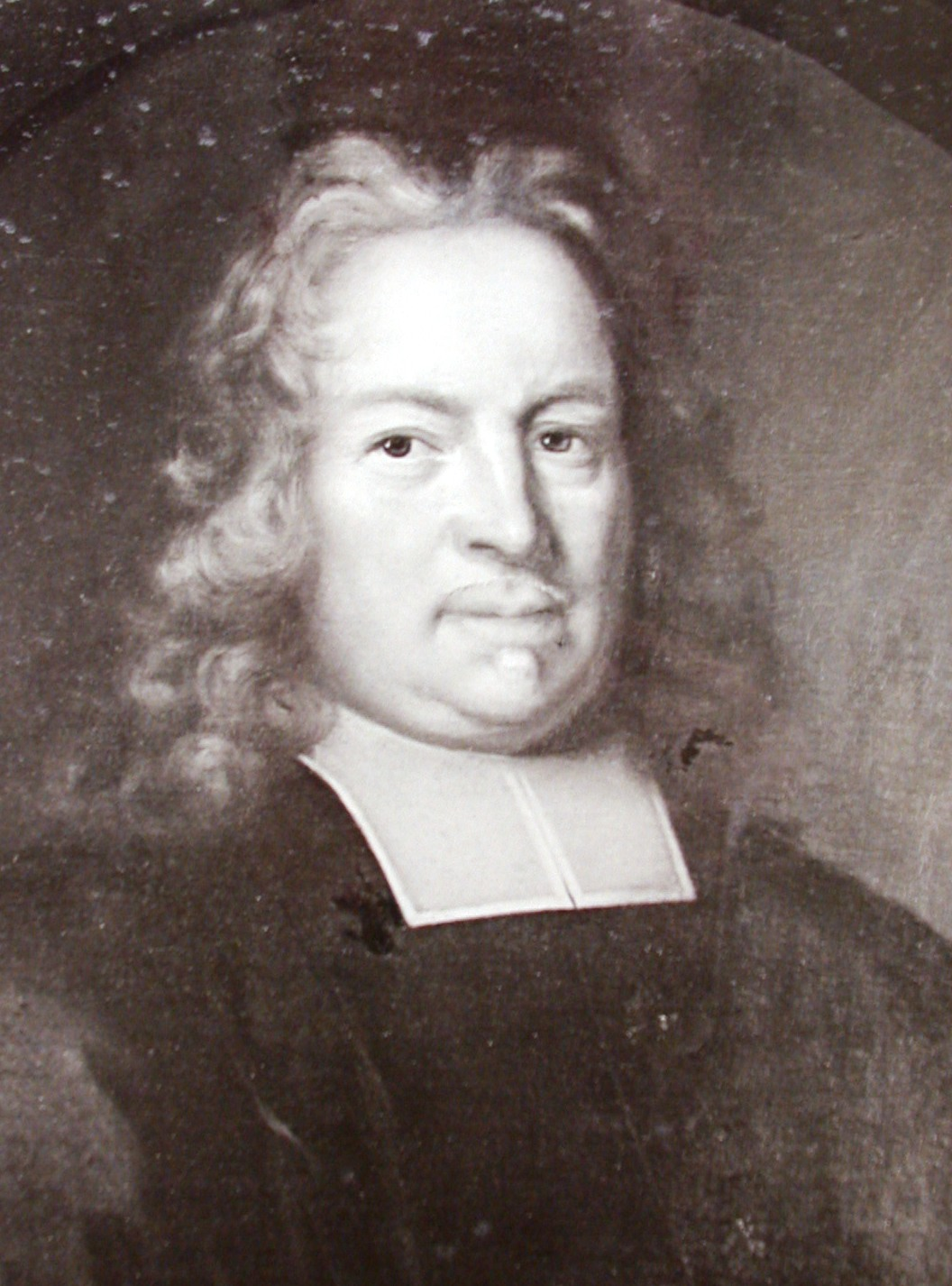
Johannes Bilberg

Johannes Bilberg (17 November 1646 – 11 March 1717) was a Swedish theologian, professor and bishop. As a professor he was involved in the controversy over Cartesianism.

He was the son of school principal and vicar Jonas Amberni and his wife Ingrid Denckert. At the age of thirteen Bilberg started studying at Uppsala University. After he graduated with Bachelor of Arts, he took employment as a tutor for a young baron named Ulf Bonde on a trip around the continent of Europe when they visited royal courts and universities. When he returned home in 1677 he was named professor of mathematics at Uppsala University.

At this time a controversy had erupted between the new Cartesian philosophy and the theological orthodoxy in Uppsala. Priests at the Riksdag were also involved in the debate, which made the government feel compelled to set up a special commission to investigate the matter. A compromise was reached and Bilberg and the Cartesians were given full rights.

The conflict and battle continued until Bilberg, with the blessing of the King of Sweden, became dean and vicar in Örebro in 1692. In his new home he gathered a number of young disciples who he educated in theology and philosophy. At the command of King Karl XI, Bilberg travelled to Torneå and Kengis along with Anders Spole to study the midnight sun. The expedition, dedicated to Karl as "sun-king", observed that the sun could indeed be observed around the clock at high altitudes. Bilberg afterwards published a work in Latin and Swedish under the title of Refractio solis inoccidui, in septemtrionalibus oris (About the refraction of the midnight sun, in the Northlands).

In 1683, Bilberg married Margareta Staaf, whose father was a trader in Uppsala. The couple had four children together. All four were knighted by Karl XII in Bender at which time they were entitled to retain their father's last name of Bilberg.

Bilberg was involved in the debate over Sweden's calendar reform. To avoid a sudden 11-day jump, he proposed that the transition between the Julian and Gregorian calendars be made gradually by omitting days over a 12-year period. To buy time for further academic debate, the government adopted a modified version of this approach, omitting only the single leap day of 1700. This resulted in the unique, isolated Swedish calendar used from 1700 to 1712. Ultimately, the transition failed and the Julian calendar was restored. It took until 1753 for Sweden to finally adopt the Gregorian calendar.

In 1701, Bilberg was named bishop of Strängnäs after Erik Benzelius resigned to become archbishop. He continued as bishop in that congregation until his death in 1717.
