= Minuscule 155 =

- New Testament manuscript
- Name: Alexandrino-Vaticanus
- Text: Gospels
- Date: 13th-century
- Script: Greek
- Now at: Vatican Library
- Size: 15.3 cm by 11.3 cm
- Type: Byzantine text-type
- Category: V
- Note: member of the family K^{r} marginalia

Minuscule 155 (in the Gregory-Aland numbering), ε 403 (Soden), is a Greek minuscule manuscript of the New Testament, on parchment. Palaeographically it has been assigned to the 13th century. It has marginalia.

== Description ==
The codex contains a complete text of the four Gospels on 307 parchment leaves (size 15.3 cm by 11.3 cm). The text is written in one column per page, in 20 lines per page.

The text is divided according to the κεφαλαια (chapters), whose numbers are given at the margin, and the τιτλοι (titles of chapters) at the top of the pages. There is also a division according to the smaller Ammonian Sections (in Mark 241 – 16:20), but it was added by later hand.

It contains Synaxarion (liturgical book with hagiographies), subscriptions at the end of each Gospel, with numbers of στιχοι at the end of each Gospel. Some lessons from Paul prefixed.

== Text ==
The Greek text of the codex is a representative of the Byzantine text-type. Hermann von Soden classified it to the textual family K^{r}. Aland placed it in Category. According to the Claremont Profile Method it belongs to the textual family K^{r} in Luke 1 and Luke 20. In Luke 20 no profile was made.

== History ==
As of the 2010s, the manuscript was dated by the INTF to the 13th century.

It was given by Andreas Rivetus to Rutgersius (1589-1625), Swedish Ambassador to the United Provinces. It belonged to Daniel Heinsius and Nicholas Heinsius. It was cited by Daniel Heinsius, as Codex Rutgersii, in his Exercitationes sacrae in Evangel. (1639) After Nicholas Heinsius it belonged to Queen Christina of Sweden and Cardinal Pietro Ottoboni.

Heinsius, one of its owner, worked on the Textus Receptus of the Greek New Testament for Elzeviers edition (1624, 1633), than influence of the codex 155 on the Textus Receptus is possible. According to Jonge it is possible only in 12 places, but all of this changes can be explained by the influence of the Complutensian Polyglotte.

It was examined by Wettstein, Birch (about 1782), Scholz, C. R. Gregory (1886), Jonge. Wettstein designated it by number 99.

It is housed at the Vatican Library (Reg. gr. 79), at Rome.

== See also ==
- List of New Testament minuscules
- Biblical manuscript
- Textual criticism
