= Marc Mortier =

Belgian businessman

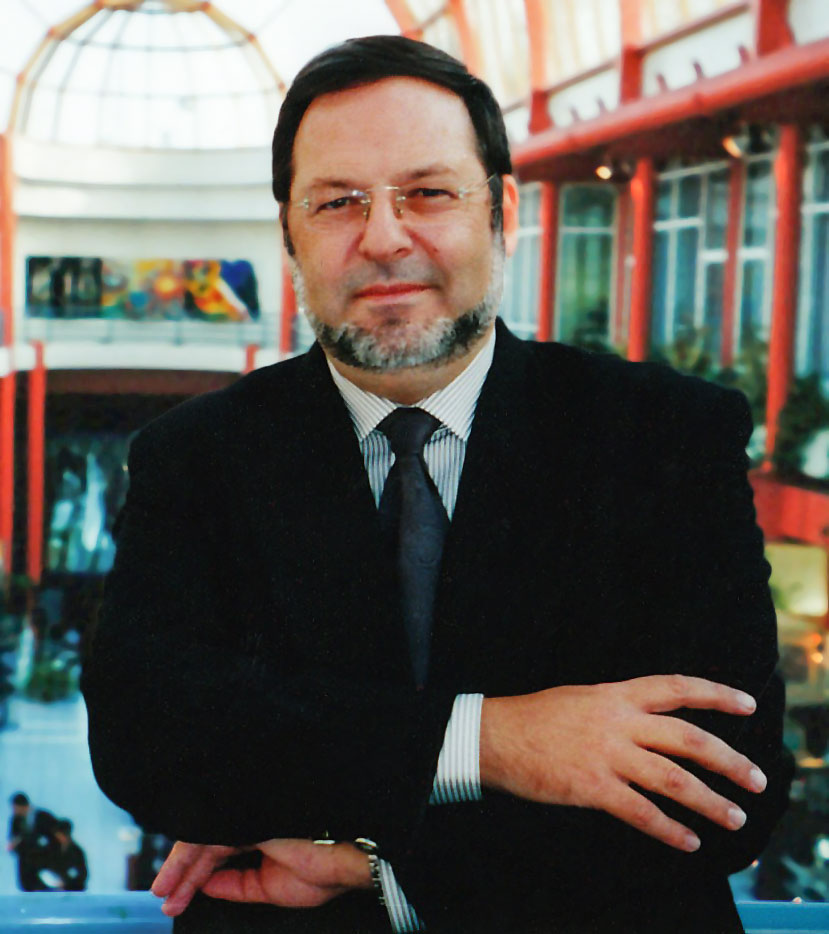
Marc Mortier CEO Flanders Expo 2002

Marc Mortier (9 December 1948 – 3 May 2004) was CEO of Flanders Expo from its foundation in 1986 to 2002. Flanders Expo is the biggest event hall in Flanders, and the second biggest in Belgium (Flanders Expo's indoor surface is 55,000 m²). Mortier later became president of Febelux, the Federation of Exhibitions in Belgium and Luxemburg.

Mortier was an active member of the board of the soccer team K.A.A. Gent from 1988 until his death in 2004. After the degradation in 1988, Mortier consulted the Prime Minister of Belgium, Wilfried Martens, in order to establish an organisation named Foot Invest, to get the team back on track. Marc Mortier gathered at that time more than 50 million Belgian francs (1.25 million euros) in sponsoring in a couple of months and introduced VDK Spaarbank as the main sponsor.

Mortier also was a member of the Board of 'Voetbalmagazine' (the Belgian national soccer magazine), 'Flanders Sports Arena, 'King Baudouin Foundation', 'The International Year Exposition of Flanders', 'The Festival of Flanders', and the Rotary Club (who honoured him individually with a Paul Harris Fellow One Star).

Mortier died in hospital at 55 years old of a heart attack on 3 May 2004.
