= Lapidary style =

Lapidary style refers to (printed) texts that imitate the style of inscriptions. They may use punctuation marks to separate words, which has been interpreted as indicating rhythmic halts. In the lapidary style, lines of unequal length are arranged symmetrically to resemble an ancient inscription. The style was popular especially in the literature of the 17th century. It was used more often for poetry than prose. The most typical metres were elegiac distich and hexametre..
