= Jitka Malovaná =

Czech artist (born 1955)

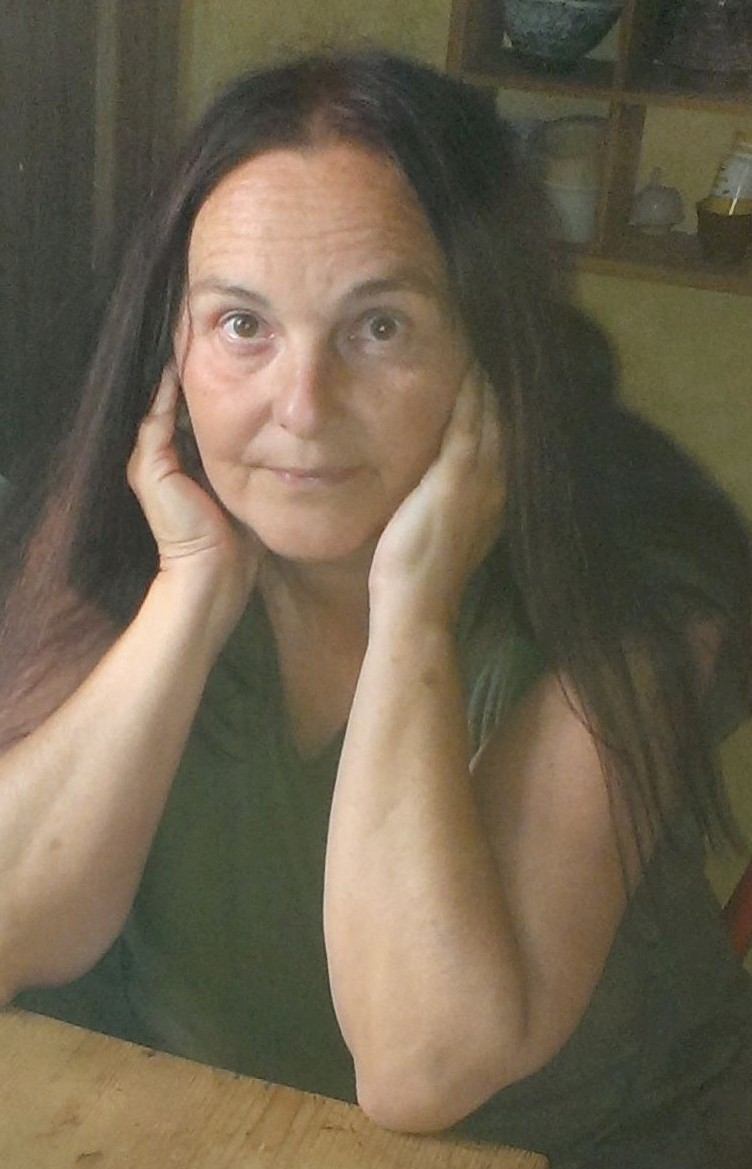
Jitka Malovaná in 2016

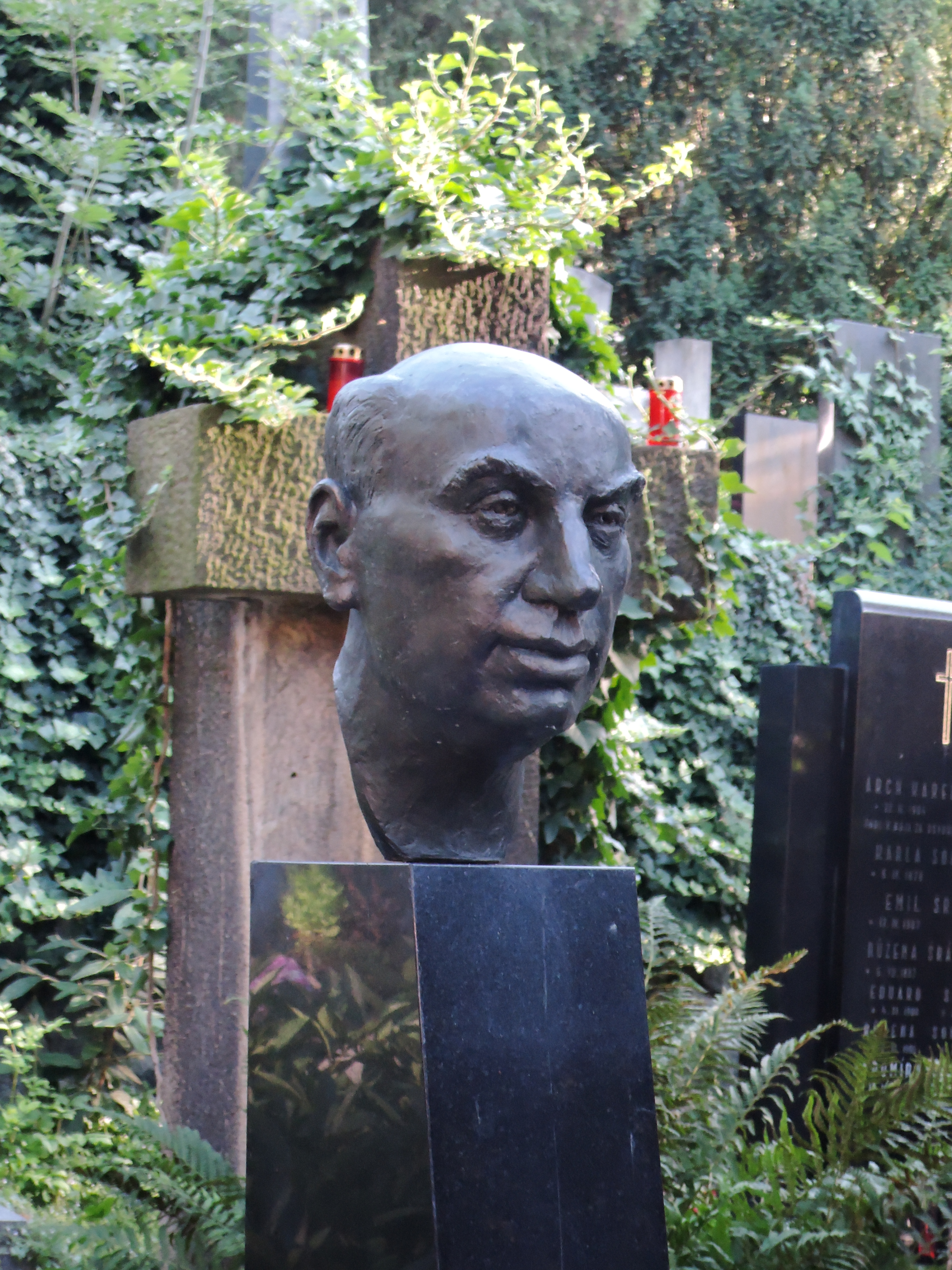
Bust of Oldřich Černík, 1995; Slavín cemetery, Prague-Vyšehrad

Jitka Malovaná (née Jitka Mašková; born 12 August 1955), is a Czech sculptor, ceramicist, restorer and high school teacher.

== Biography ==
Malovaná was born on 12 August 1955 in Český Krumlov. Between 1970 and 1974 she studied on the vocational school of ceramics in Bechyně. In 1974–1980 she absolved studies of sculpture on the Academy of Arts, Architecture and Design in Prague, in the studio of the professor Josef Malejovský. She practiced as a stone cutter, too. She married the sculptor Pavel Malovaný (1958-2011).

In 1997–2002 she participated on a restoration of Reliquary of St. Maurus by modeling additions of figures of saints. Stone sculpture she restored in the Lapidarium, Prague of the National Museum (1999–2015) and on Vrchotovy Janovice castle (since 2002).

=== Teacher ===
Since 2005 she has been learning modeling and sculpture on the Department of Alternative and Puppet Theatre of the Academy of Performing Arts in Prague. She also teaches drawing and painting on the Academy of the Third Age (on the High School of Economics in Prague).

== Work ==
She likes creation of figural statues, especially portrait heads, and drawing.

Some artworks

- Bust of the Czech politician Oldřicha Černíka on his tomb in Slavín cemetery, brass, 1995, Prague-Vyšehrad
- Bust of the girl Ulrike von Levetzow, the last love of Johann Wolfgang Goethe; plaster, 2002; Regional Museum in Most, Lapidarium, Prague of the National Museum.
- Bust of the Czech jazz singer Karel Hála, brass, 2016 (on his residence house in Prague).

Restoration

- Early gothic half-statue of saint Agnes of Bohemia from the St. Agnes Monastery in Prague (2006)
