= Narona Archaeological Museum =

Archaeological Museum Narona
- Arheološki muzej Narona
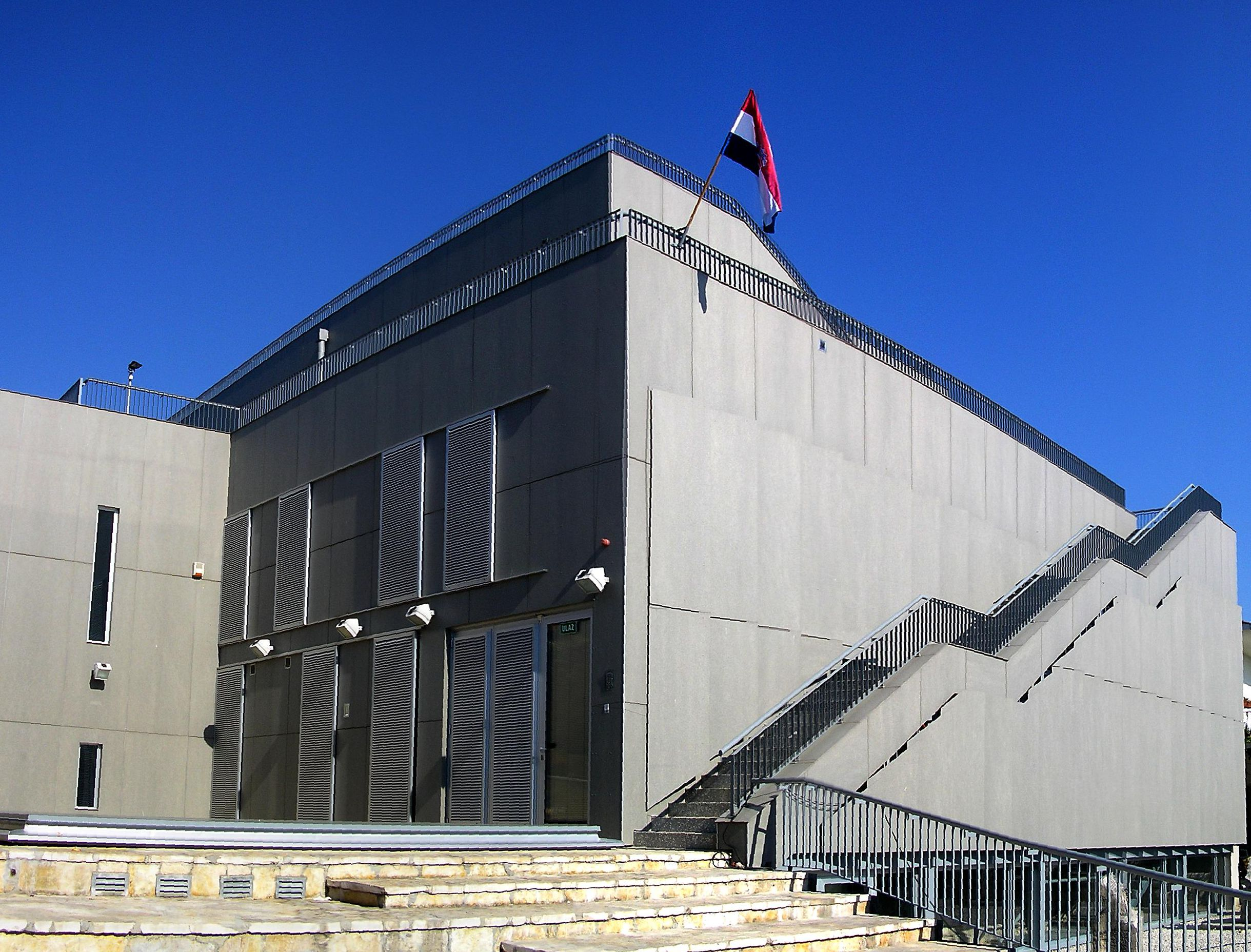
- Established: 28 April 2005; 21 years ago
- Location: Vid, Croatia
- Coordinates: 43°04′49″N 17°37′41″E
- Type: Archaeological museum

Archaeological Museum Narona (Croatian: Arheološki muzej Narona) is a museum in Vid in the town Metković, built on the site of Augusteum, a temple dedicated to the emperor Augustus.

== Background ==
The first known archaeological excavations in Narona were conducted in 1877 under the leadership of the then director of the Split Archaeological Museum, Mihovil Glavinić.

== Museum building ==
The project of the first museum in Croatia built in situ by Croatian architect Goran Rako has won the "Vladimir Nazor" award. The foundation stone was laid on July 19, 2004, and the museum opened to visitors on May 18, 2007. The institution was formally founded by the Croatian Government in 2005.

== Gallery ==
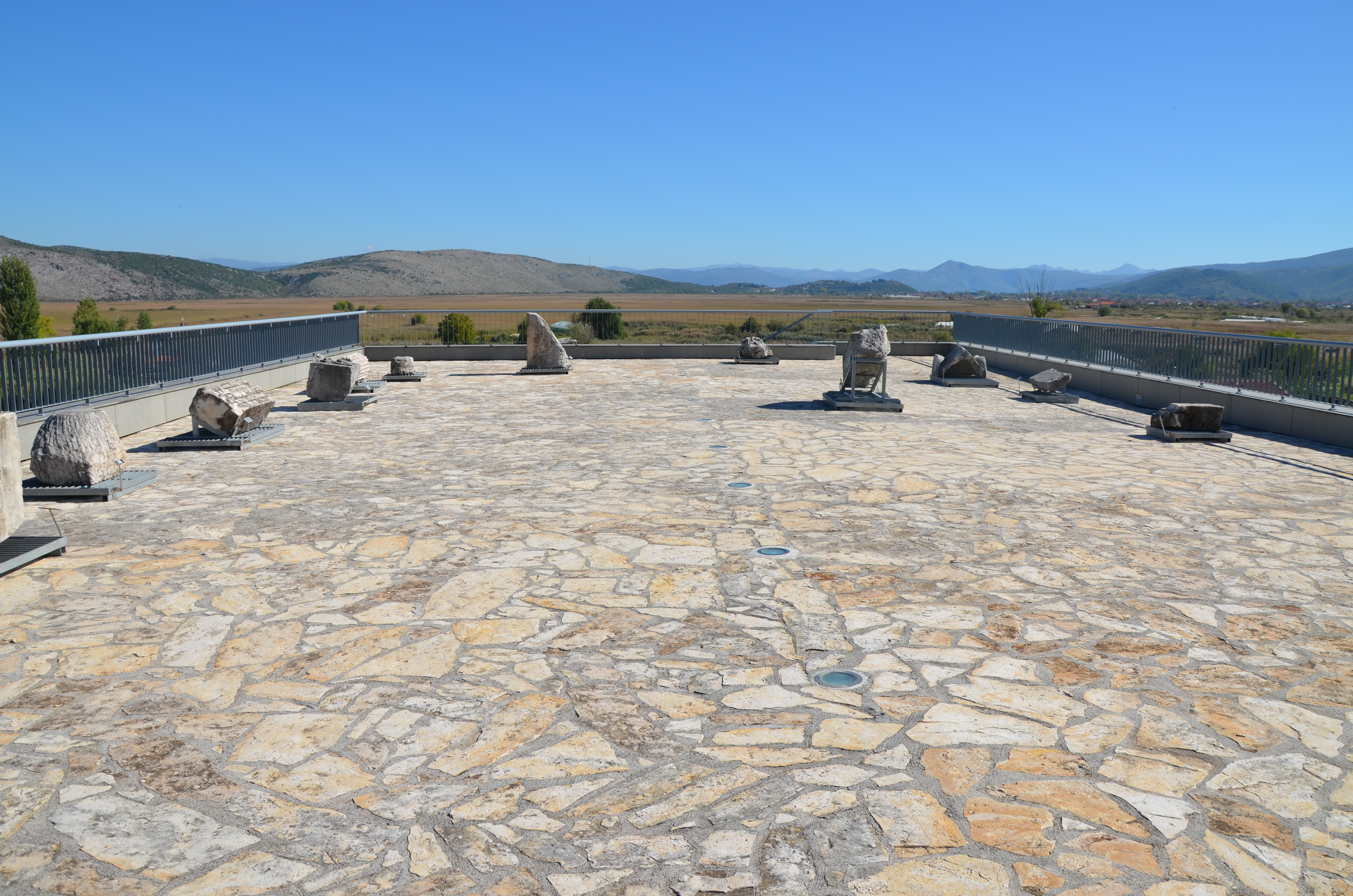
Part of the outdoor display on top of the museum building
