= The Lapidarium of Kings =

Coordinates: 55.6731°N 12.5798°E

- Kongernes Lapidarium
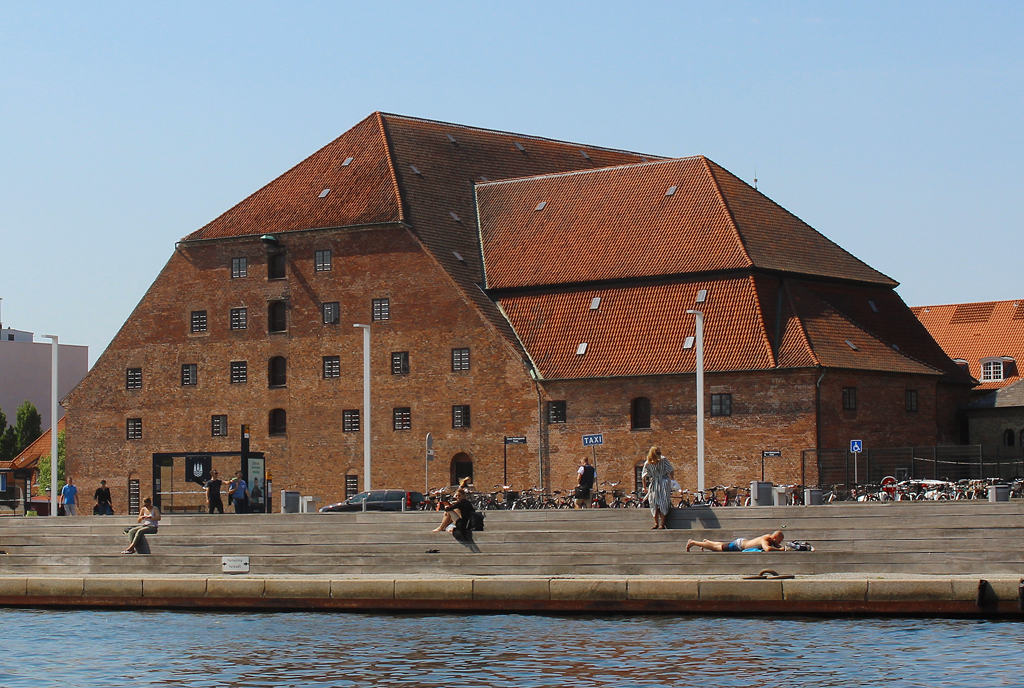
- Kongernes Lapidarium
- Established: June 3, 2014
- Location: Copenhagen, Denmark
- Type: Sculpture Museum
- Collection size: 300 statues, sculptures, and ornamentation
- Owners: Palace and Culture Agency (Styrelsen for Slotte & Kulturejendomme)
- Website: Explore The Lapidarium of Kings

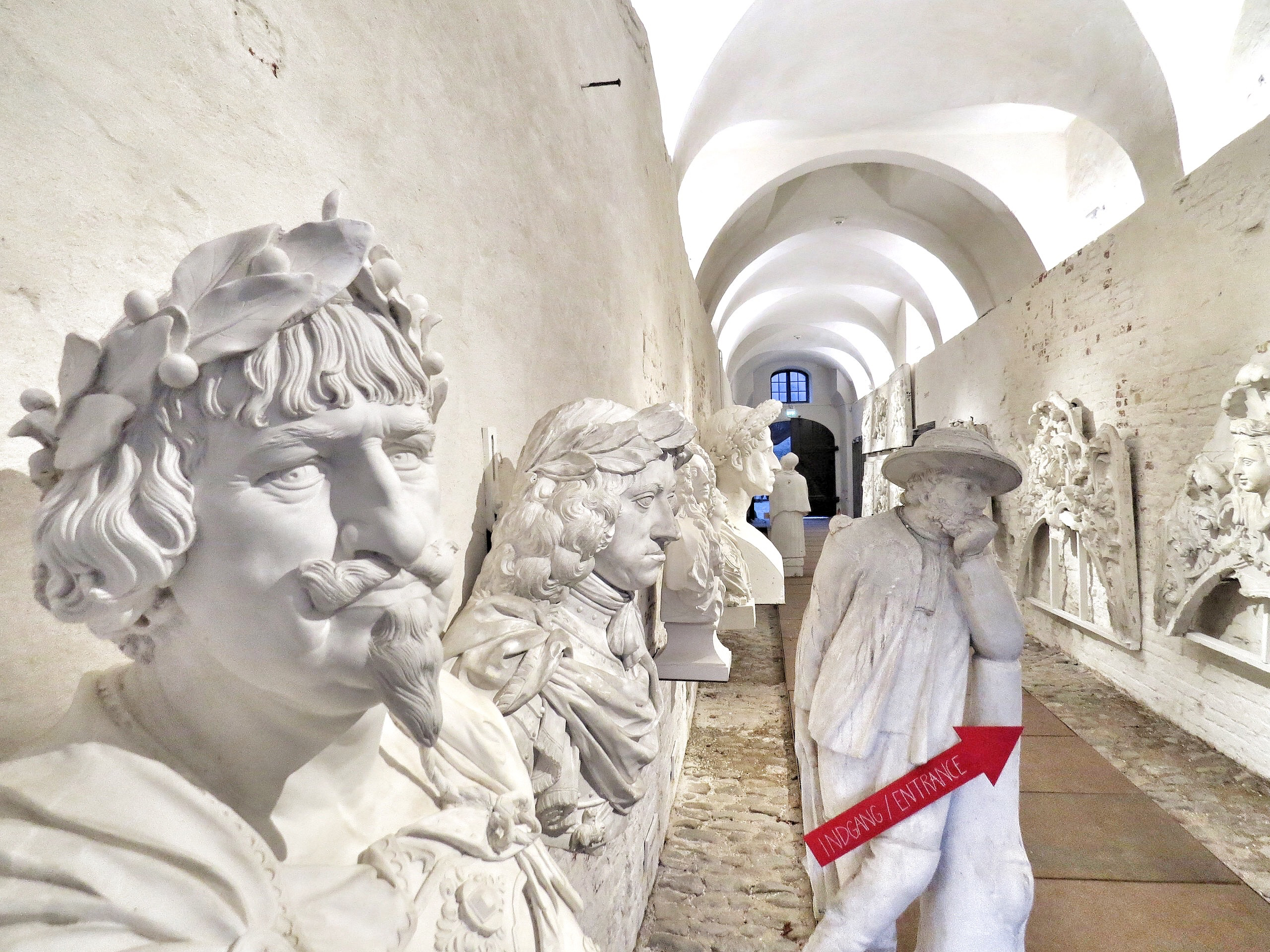
The entrance to the Lapidarium with a bust of king Christian IV to the left

The Lapidarium of Kings (Kongernes Lapidarium) is a lapidarium in Copenhagen, Denmark. It exhibits a royal collection of sculptures, natural stone figures and plaster models.

The museum is situated in the 400 year old brewhouse of King Christian IV. During the years leading up to 2013, the Board of the Palace and Culture Agency (Styrelsen for Slotte & Kulturejendomme), with the support of TrygFonden, implemented a fire protection of the 8,000-storey square meter brew house, to enable the building to be opened to the public. Lapidarium was officially opened on June 3, 2014.

The collection consists of 300 statues, sculptures and ornamentation in different materials gathered from royal gardens, palaces and buildings. Among the treasures are a model of the equestrian statue of King Frederick V at Amalienborg, and the original equestrian statue of Christian V at Kongens Nytorv.
