= Oldřich Černík =

Czech politician, prime minister of Czechoslovakia

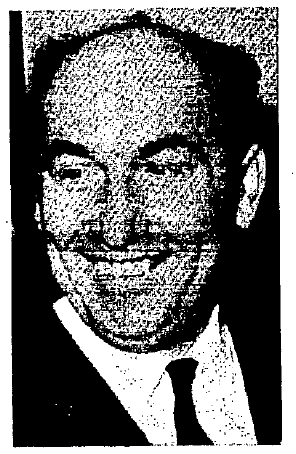

Prime Minister of Czechoslovakia
- In office 8 April 1968 – 28 January 1970
- President: Ludvík Svoboda
- Preceded by: Jozef Lenárt
- Succeeded by: Lubomír Štrougal

Personal details
- Born: 21 October 1921 Ostrava, Czechoslovakia
- Died: 19 October 1994 (aged 72) Prague, Czech Republic
- Party: Communist Party of Czechoslovakia

Oldřich Černík (27 October 1921 – 19 October 1994) was a Czech communist politician. He was the prime minister of Czechoslovakia from 8 April 1968 to 28 January 1970.

== Career ==
A party official and well-known technocrat, Černík was a strong supporter of the Prague Spring reforms of 1968. In August 1968 he was forced to go to the Soviet Union along with other politicians, and when he returned he asked the Czech people to cooperate with the Soviet Union but promised to continue reforms. After party leader Alexander Dubček was replaced with Gustáv Husák in 1969, Černík publicly distanced himself from his previous support of reform. It was not enough to prevent him from being forced out as prime minister in 1970; he was expelled from the party soon afterward. He attempted a political comeback in the early 1990s after the end of the communist regime. In 1994, he survived a serious car accident; shortly afterward he died in Prague of cardiac arrest. His grave portrait at the Vyšehrad Cemetery was created by Jitka Malovaná.

Political offices
Preceded by Jozef Lenárt	Prime Minister of Czechoslovakia; 1968–1970	Succeeded by Lubomír Štrougal
