= Lapidarium =

Place exhibiting stone monuments and fragments

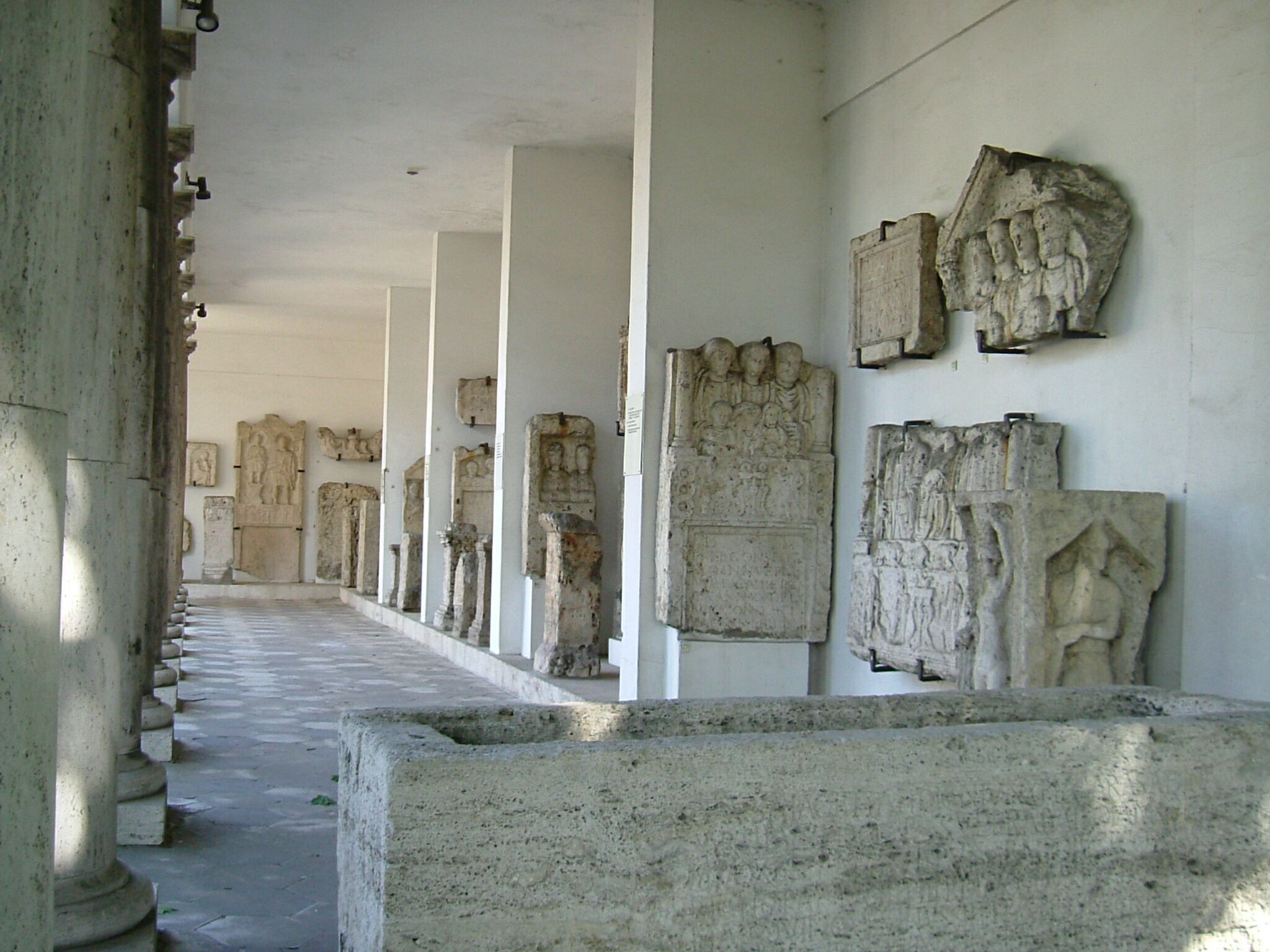
The lapidarium section in the Aquincum Museum, Budapest, Hungary

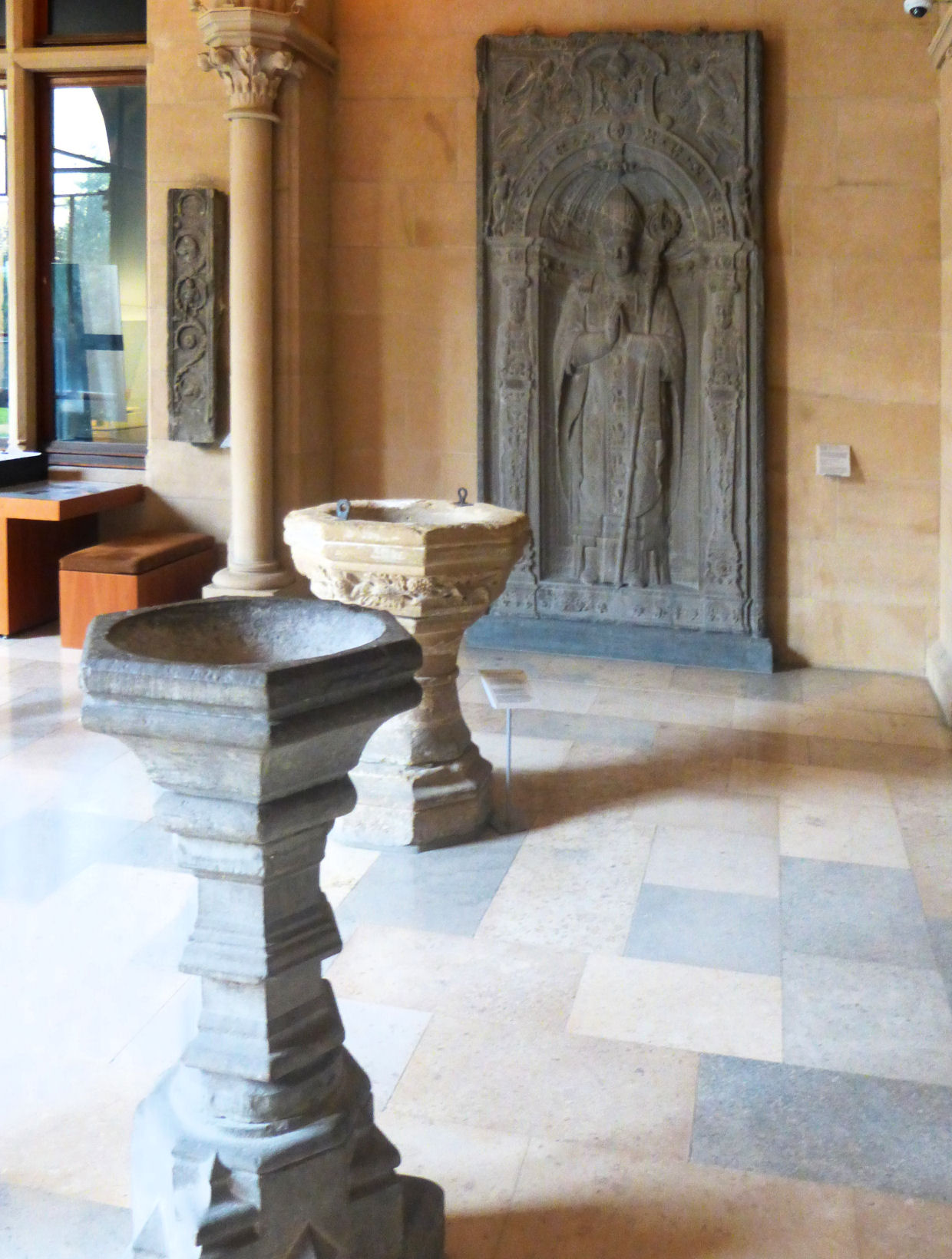
Lapidarium, Brussels

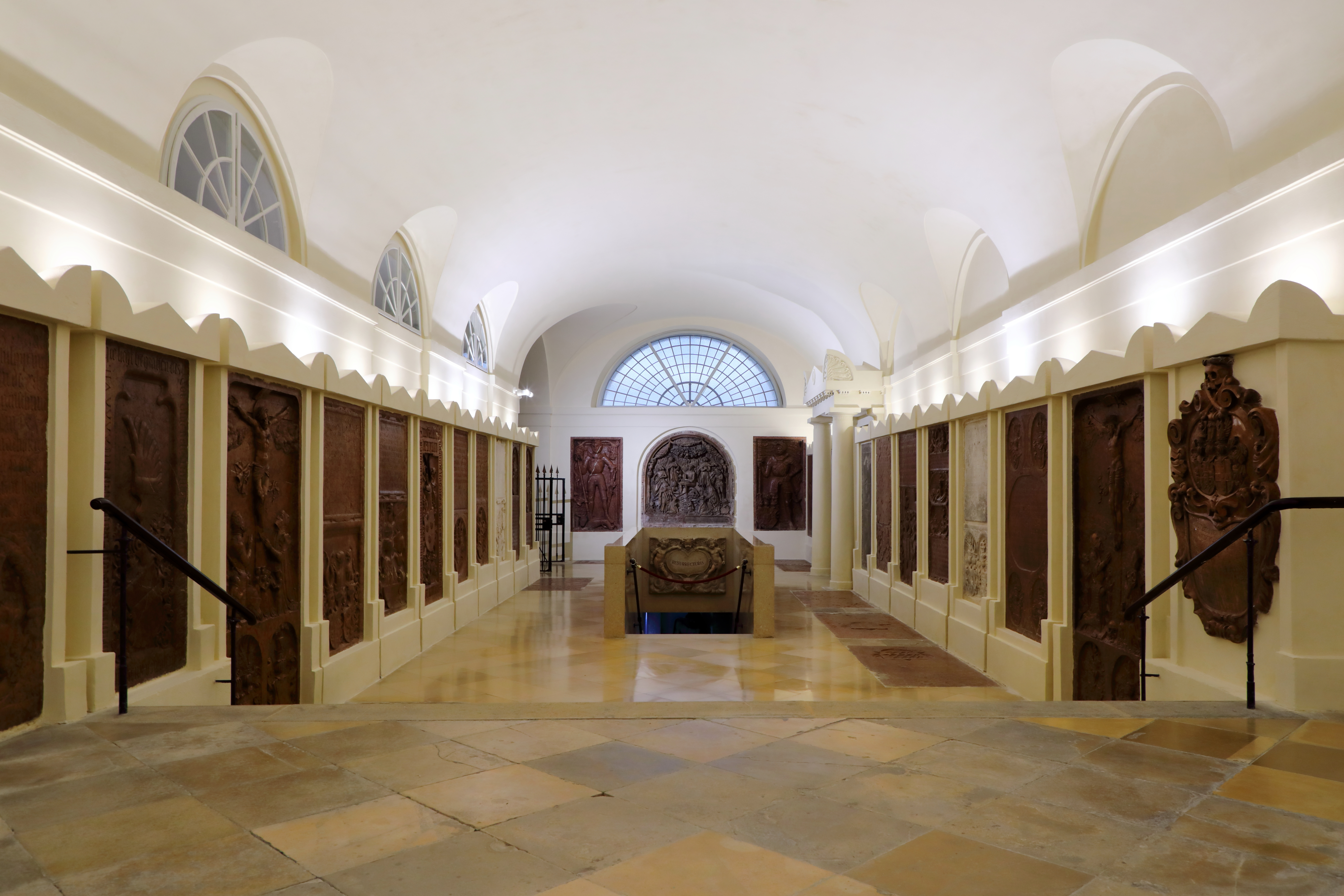
Lapidarium with epitaphs in the Schottenstift (Scottish Abbey), Vienna

A lapidarium is a place where stone (Latin: lapis) monuments and fragments of archaeological interest are exhibited.

They can include stone epigraphs; statues; architectural elements such as columns, cornices, and acroterions; bas reliefs, tombstones; and sarcophagi.

Such collections are often displayed in the outdoor courtyards of archaeology museums and history museums.

A lapidary museum could either be a lapidarium or – less often – a gem museum (e.g. the Mineral and Lapidary Museum, North Carolina).

== Examples ==
- The Lapidarium (in the National Museum), Prague, Czechia
- The Lapidarium, Kerch, Crimea, Ukraine
- The Lapidarium of Kings, Copenhagen, Denmark
- The Museo lapidario maffeiano (museum-lapidarium of Maffei), Verona, Italy
- The Lapidary Museum, Avignon, France
- The Estense Lapidary Museum, Modena, Italy
- Split Archaeological Museum
- Samharam Lapidarium, Khor Rowri, Oman.
- Memphite Lapidarium (Mit Rahina, Egypt)
- el-Tod Temple Complex
- Caelian Hill Archaeological Park

== See also ==
- A glyptotheque, a sculpture museum, usually stone sculptures
- A Lithotheque, an academic collection of natural stone samples
