= Narona =

Ancient Greek trading post on the Illyrian coast and later Roman city and bishopric

Coordinates: 43°02′47″N 17°35′55″E

Narona /nəˈroʊnə/ (Ancient Greek: Ναρῶνα) was an Ancient Greek trading post on the Illyrian coast and later Roman city and bishopric, located in the Neretva valley in present-day Vid, Croatia, which remains a Latin Catholic titular see.

== History ==
It was founded as a Greek emporium in c. 3rd/2nd century BC. First time it is mentioned in the chapter 24 of the Periplus of Pseudo-Scylax. Narona became the major Roman stronghold in the 1st century BC. It was part of the Roman province of Dalmatia. In the 6th century AD, it came under Byzantine rule. The settlement ceased to be in 7th century after the arrival of Slavic tribes in the region (see Narentines).

== Ecclesiastical history ==
- In 530 was established a Diocese of Narona (Latin = Curiate Italian) / Naronen(sis) (Latin adjective), apparently suffragan of the Metropolitan Archdiocese of Salona (now Split).
- In 533 it lost territories to establish the Diocese of Makarska and the Diocese of Sarsenterum
- In 600 it was suppressed, the city being ruined, its territory being merged into the Diocese of Ragusa.

The only recorded bishop was

- Marcello (530? – 533?), who attended councils of bishops at Salona in both named years.

=== Titular see ===
It was nominally restored in 1933 as Latin Titular bishopric of Narona.

It has had the following incumbents, mostly of the fitting Episcopal (lowest) rank, with an archiepiscopal exception :

- Leo Pietsch (1948.08.27 – death 1981.09.30) as Auxiliary Bishop of Graz–Seckau (Austria) (1948.08.27 – 1967) and on emeritate
- Titular Archbishop: John Bulaitis (born England, UK) (1981.11.21 – 2010.12.25) as papal diplomat : Apostolic Pro-Nuncio to Republic of Congo (1981.11.21 – 1987.07.11), Apostolic Pro-Nuncio to Central African Republic (1981.11.21 – 1987.07.11), Apostolic Delegate to Chad (1981.11.21 – 1987.07.11), Apostolic Pro-Nuncio to Iran (1987.07.11 – 1991.11.30), Apostolic Pro-Nuncio to Korea (1991.11.30 – 1997.03.25), Apostolic Nuncio (ambassador) to Mongolia (1992.09.08 – 1997.03.25), Apostolic Nuncio to Albania (1997.03.25 – 2008.07.26); died 2010
- Helmut Karl Dieser (2011.02.24 – 2016.09.23) as Auxiliary Bishop of Trier (western Germany) (2011.02.24 – 2016.09.23); later Bishop of Aachen (Aix-la-Chapelle, Germany) (2016.09.23 – ...)
- Heriberto Cavazos Pérez (2016.10.31 – ...), as Auxiliary Bishop of Monterrey (Mexico) (2016.10.31 – ...).

== Archeology ==
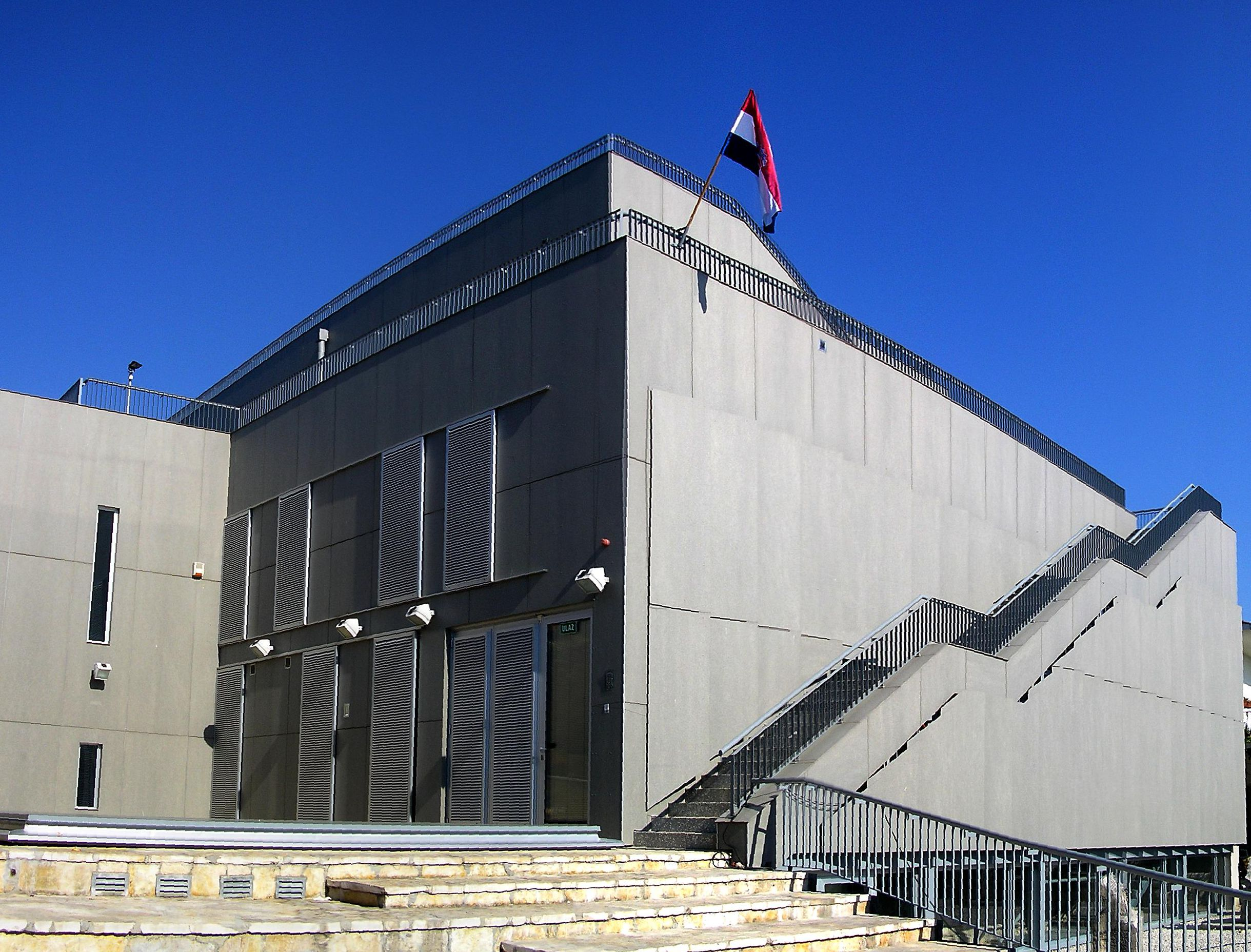
The Narona Archaeological Museum was built in 2005.

In 1995 a Roman temple building was discovered, which had been dedicated by the governor Dolabella and contained statues of the emperors Claudius and Vespasian, as well as two of Augustus and his wife Livia. The statues had been vandalized in the 4th century: they were lying on the floor and their heads had been broken off. The heads of Vespasian and one of the Livias had been acquired in the surrounding area by Arthur Evans in 1878. The heads were thus reunited with their bodies. The famous Roman statues have toured major European museums.

A cathedral and at least two more churches were dug up.

== See also ==
- List of Catholic dioceses in Croatia
- Dalmatia
- List of ancient cities in Illyria
- Salona

== Sources and external links ==
- Archeological Museum of Narona -Vid Croatia
- GCatholic - former & titular bishopric
- Pius Bonifacius Gams, Series episcoporum Ecclesiae Catholicae, Leipzig 1931, p. 410
- Nuovo bullettino di archeologia cristiana, 1906, p. 211
