= Lapidarium, Kerch =

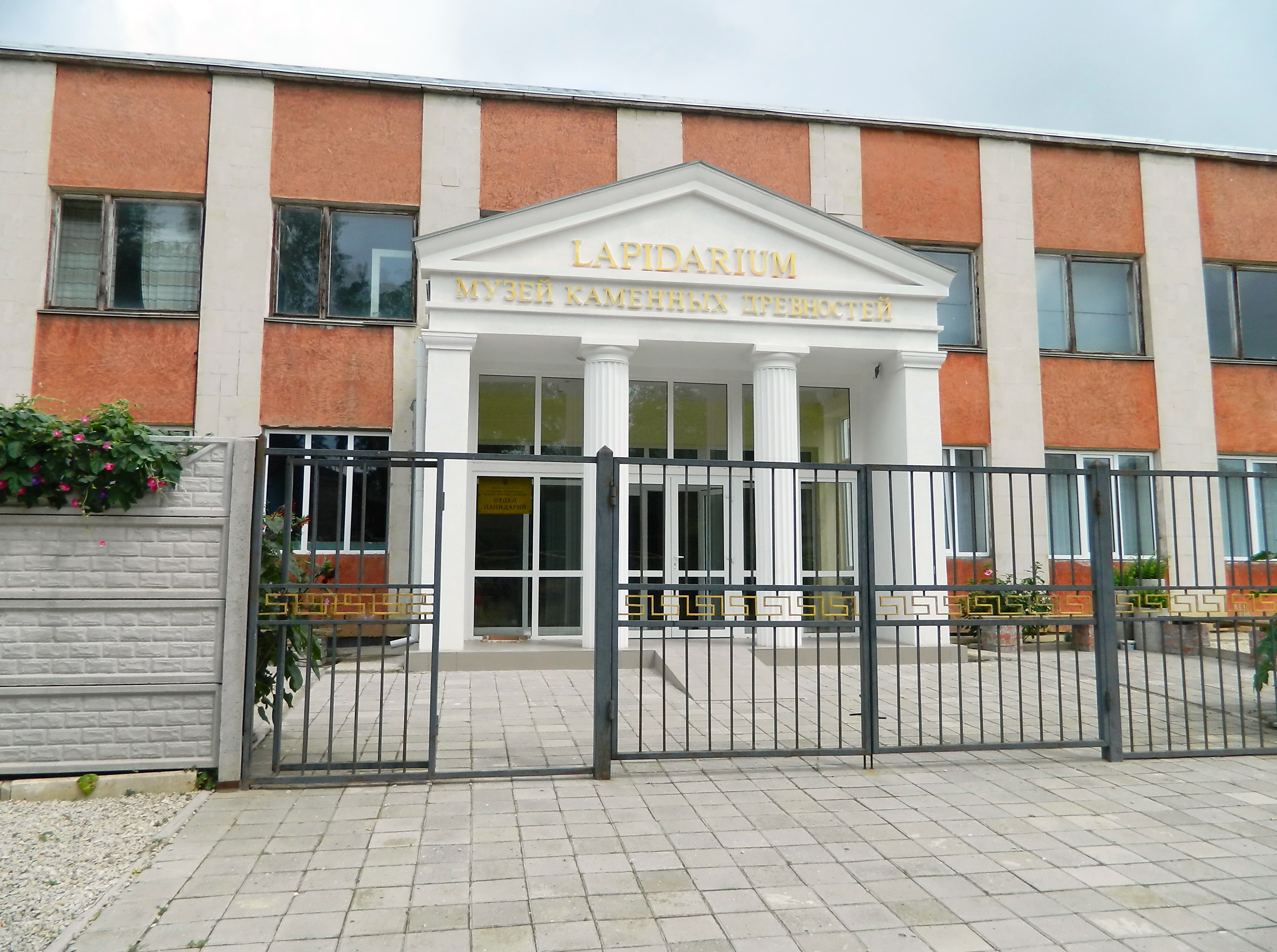
- Established: 1810–1820
- Location: R.Luxemburg Str. 24/14; Kerch, Crimea 02115
- Visitors: Public open
- Director: Kucherevskaya N. L.
- Website: Museum site

The Lapidarium is a lapidarium (museum) in Kerch, Crimea. It has a collection of samples of ancient art, containing items found during the excavation of the ancient Bosporan kingdom and other finds discovered on the territory of the Kerch Peninsula. It occupies one of leading places among the repositories of classical epigraphic monuments in the world. Lapidarium are stored in the Kerch Bosporan Greek inscriptions made in stone, sculpture and architectural details, samples, gebraistskih and Turkish gravestones.

It is open to the public on weekdays and weekends from 10:00 up to 16:00 local time, and is closed Mondays.

== History of establishment ==
The lapidary collection compiled materials from the personal collection of famous Explorer Paul Du Brux, who assembled a collection of antiquities in the 1810s and 1820 and gave it the name "Drevnehraniliŝe". Later the collection was supplemented from different sources. Most of the collection was formed in the period leading up to 1917. Some instances since then were taken to the British Museum, the Hermitage, the Pushkin Museum (Moscow) and others [1]. During the Soviet period, part of the collection was housed in the building of the Church of St. John the Baptist in Kerch. Presently the exposition of this Lapidarium is located in a separate building. It also has rooms for restoration and scientific work.

== The collection ==
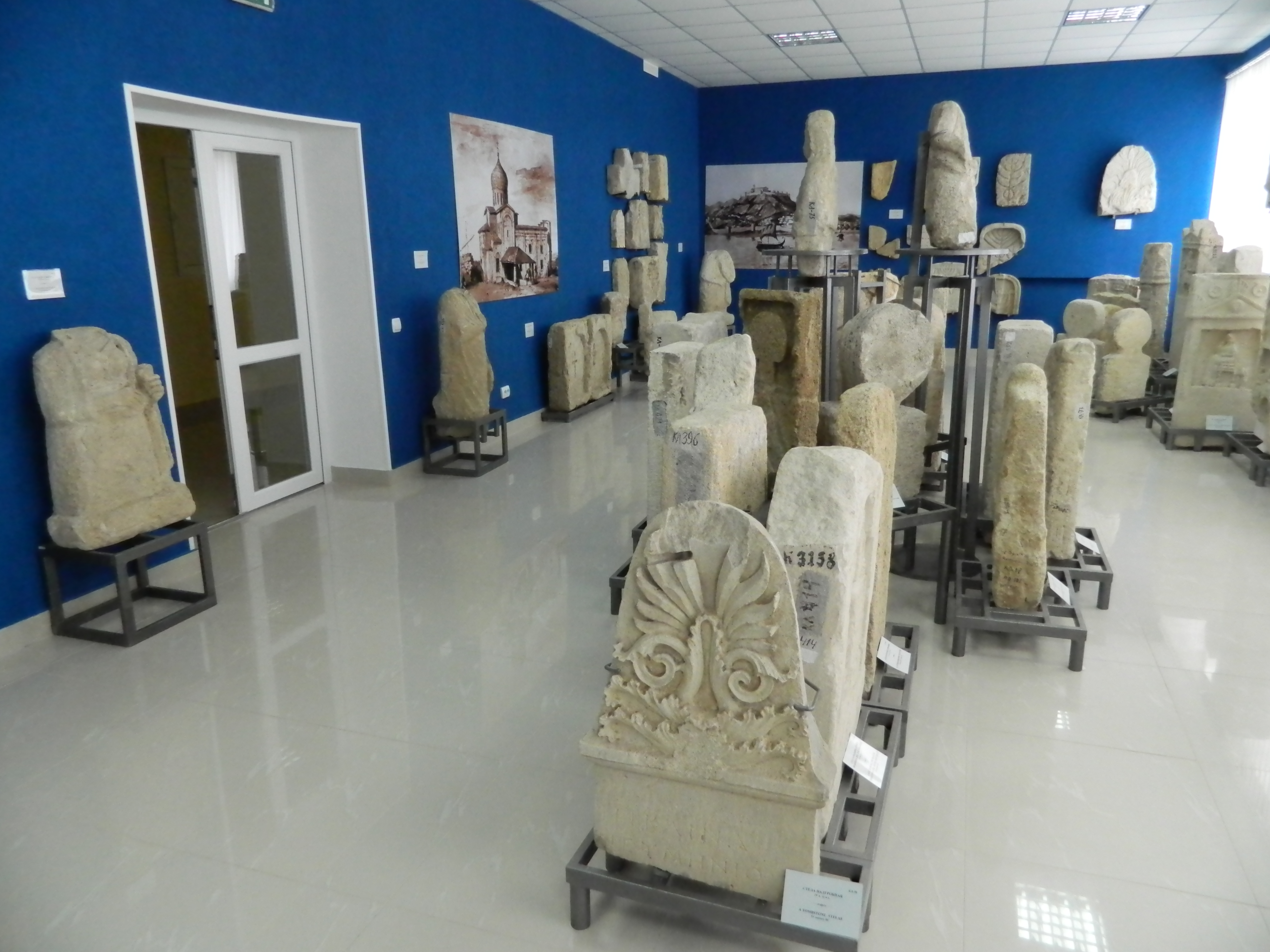

At the present time (2013) the collection of the lapidarium comprises more than 2200 storage units. In the collection of the artifacts displayed ancient (the main part of the collection) and medieval eras. Wide range of Antique sculptures, numerous gravestones and Epigraphic monuments, architectural details, cult objects. In lapidary exhibit the portrait scenes of the Bosporan Kingdom , Memorial and decorative sculpture, a work of architectural sculpture, objects of religious designation, fragments of ancient marble stellas, fountains, tables, Church facades. The exhibition illustrates various aspects of life of the population of the ancient bosporan cities. Through the annual excavations at ancient fortresses of Kerch, the collection continues to grow with new exhibits.

== Research work ==
In 2002 at the Lapidarium was founded International School conservation of stone. With the participation of the specialists from Russia, Ukraine and Denmark. The scientific and research work is conducted. Work on expansion of the exposition.

== Gallery ==
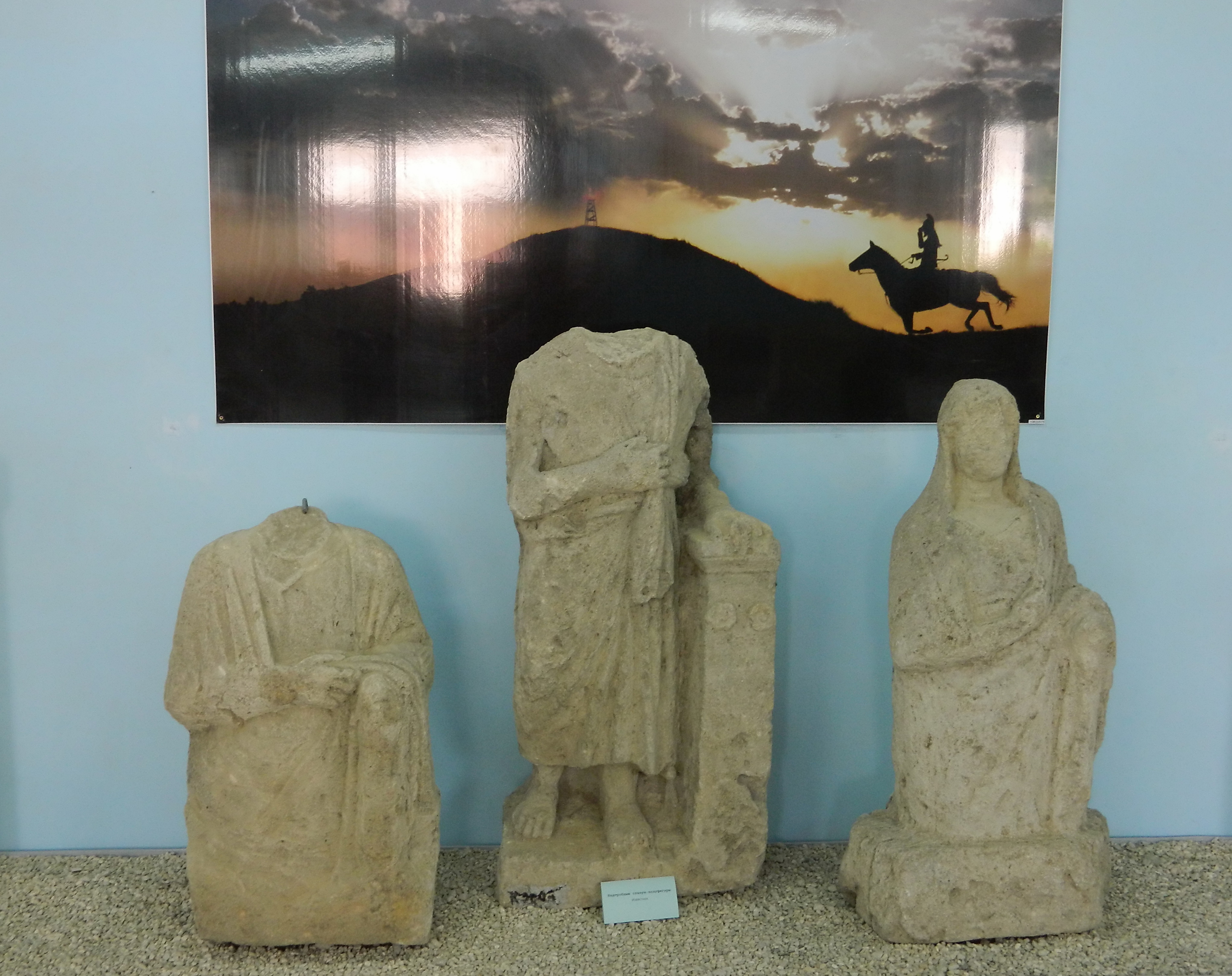
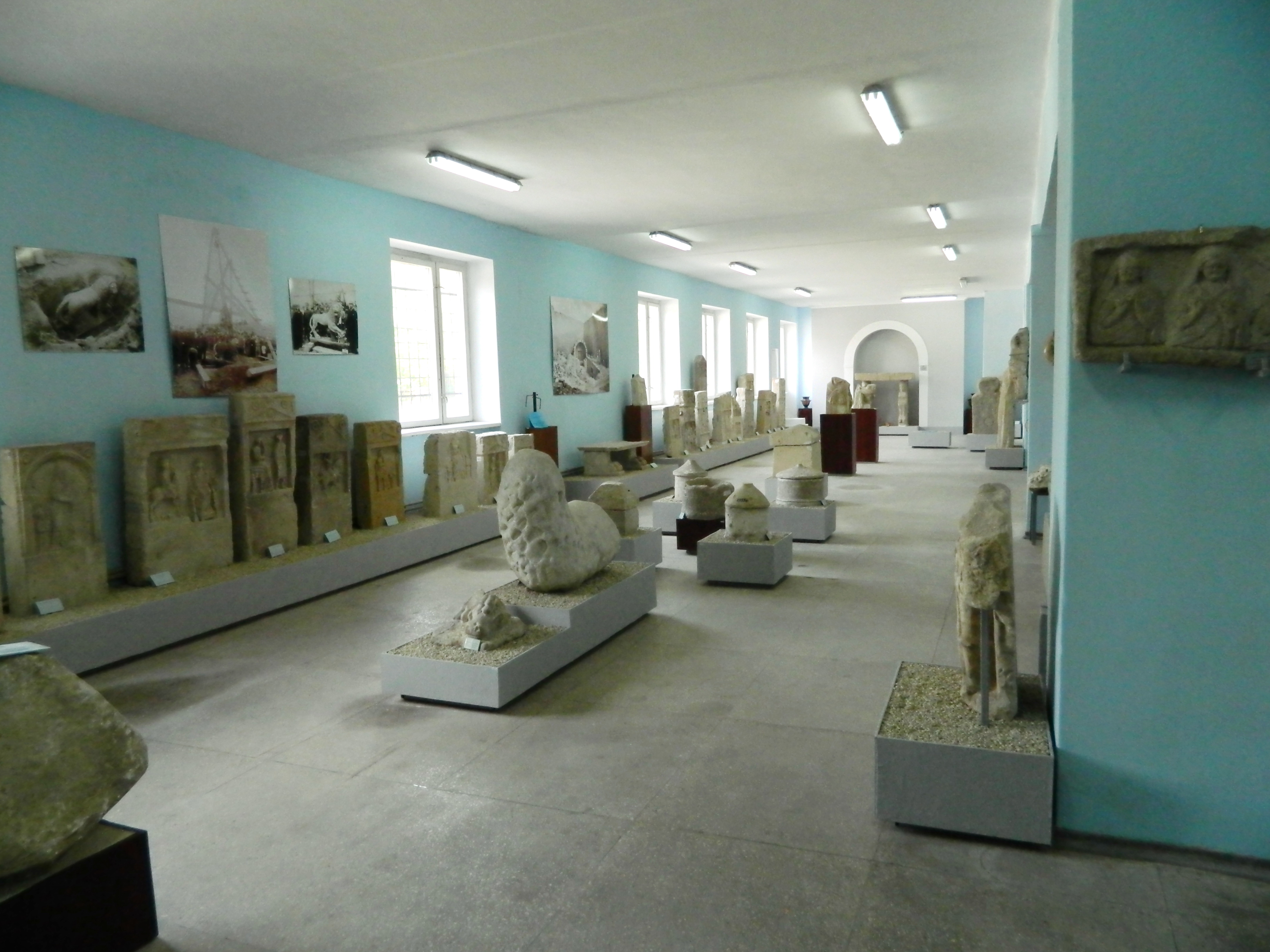
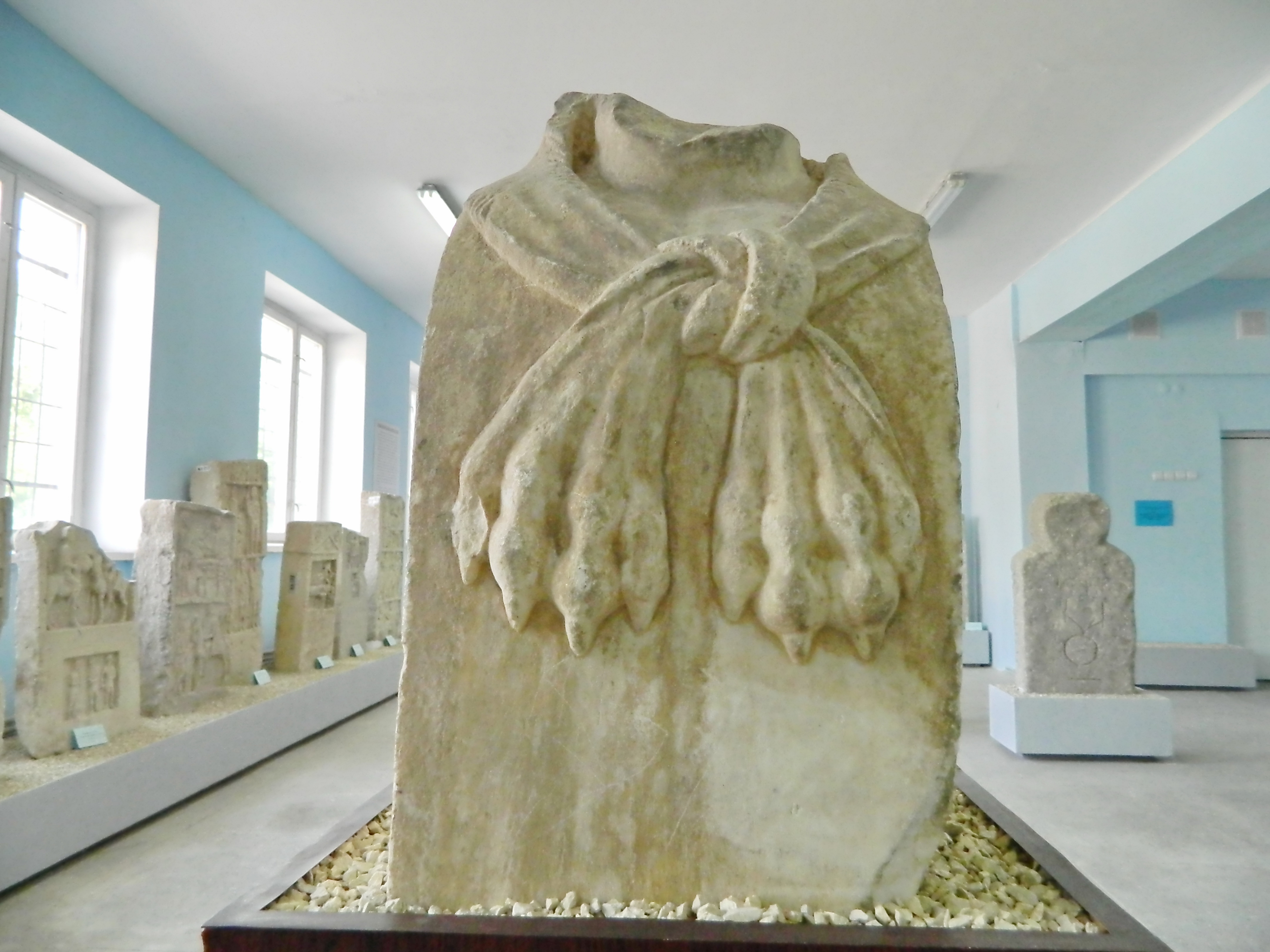
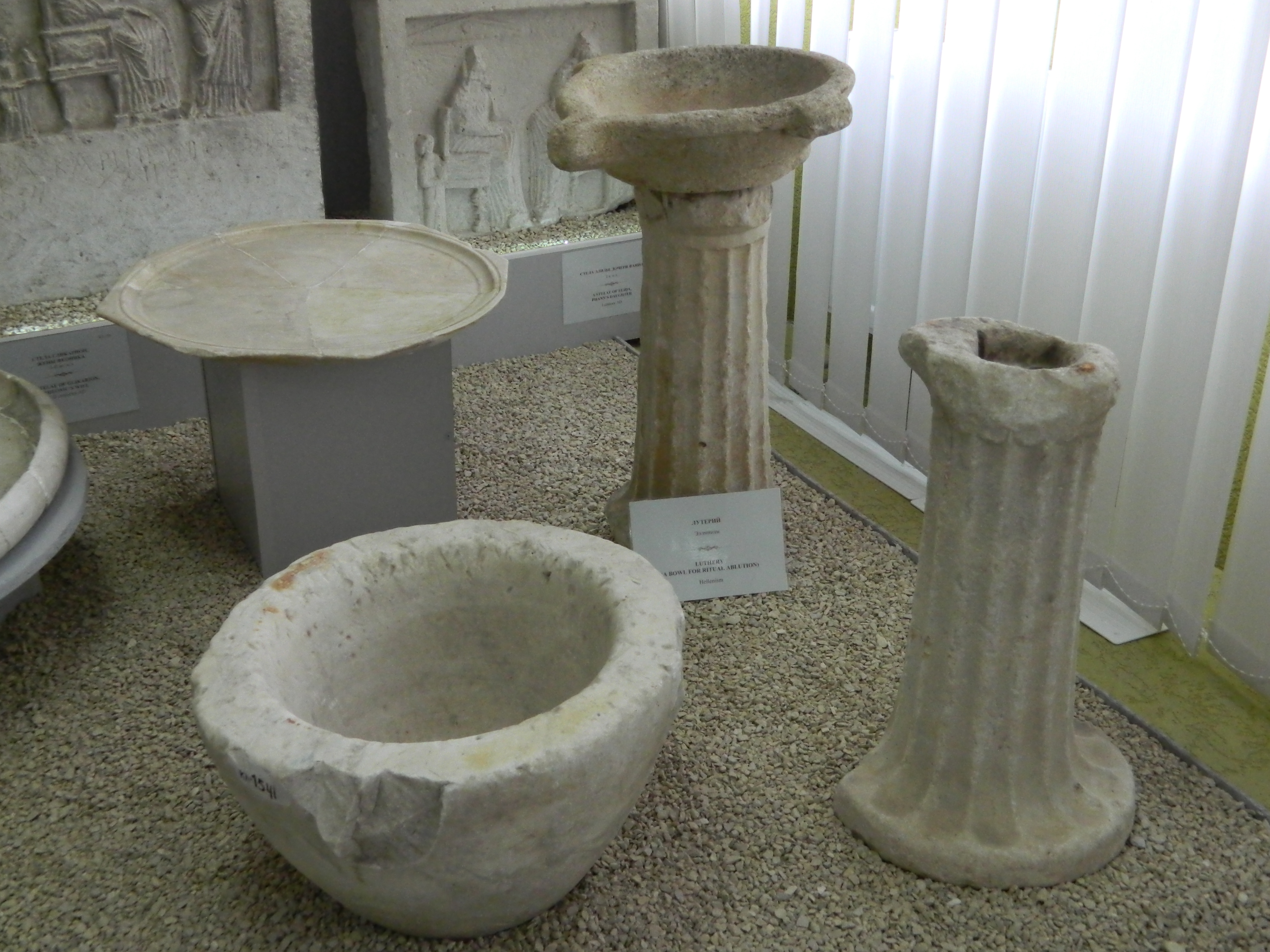
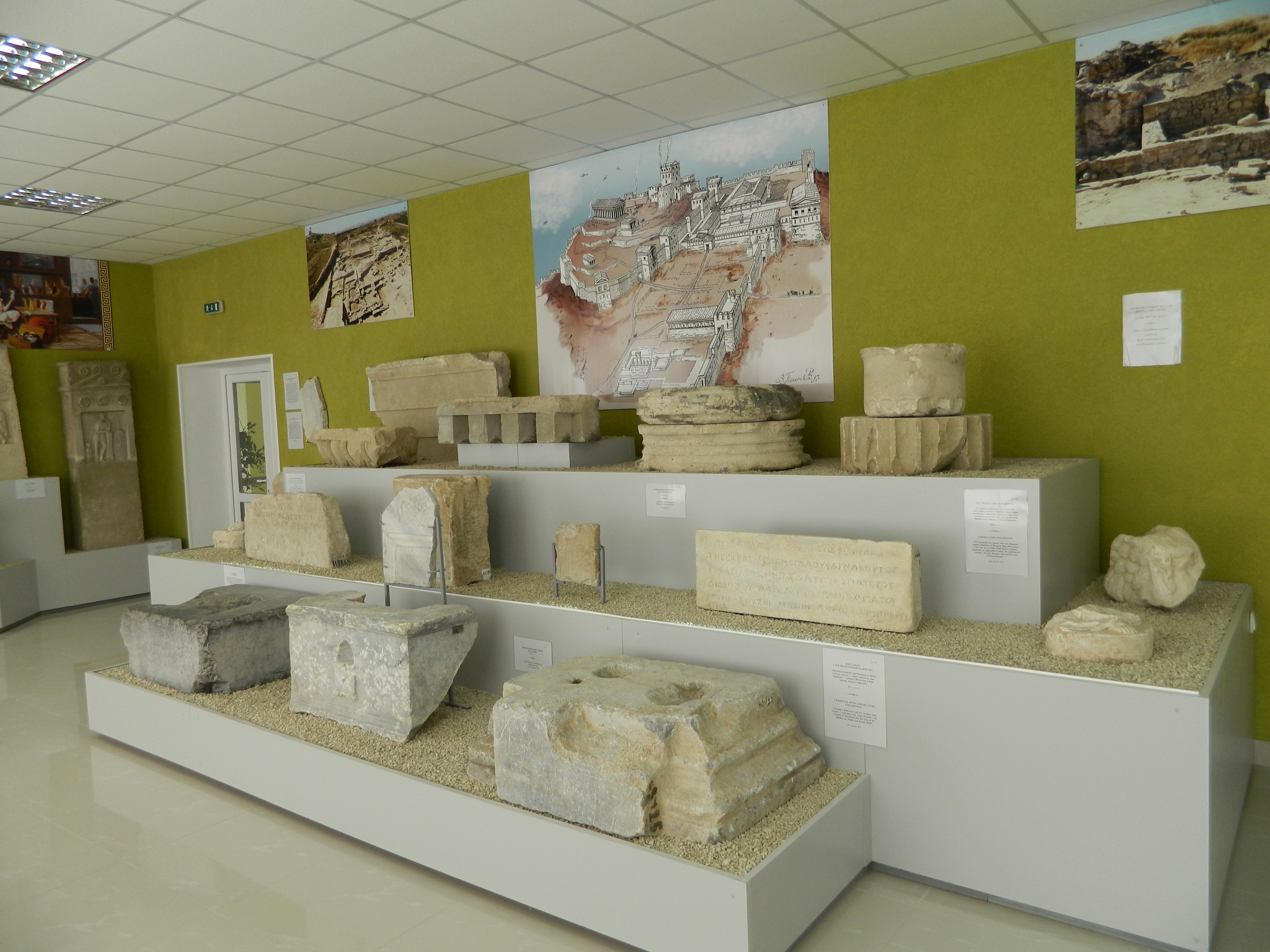
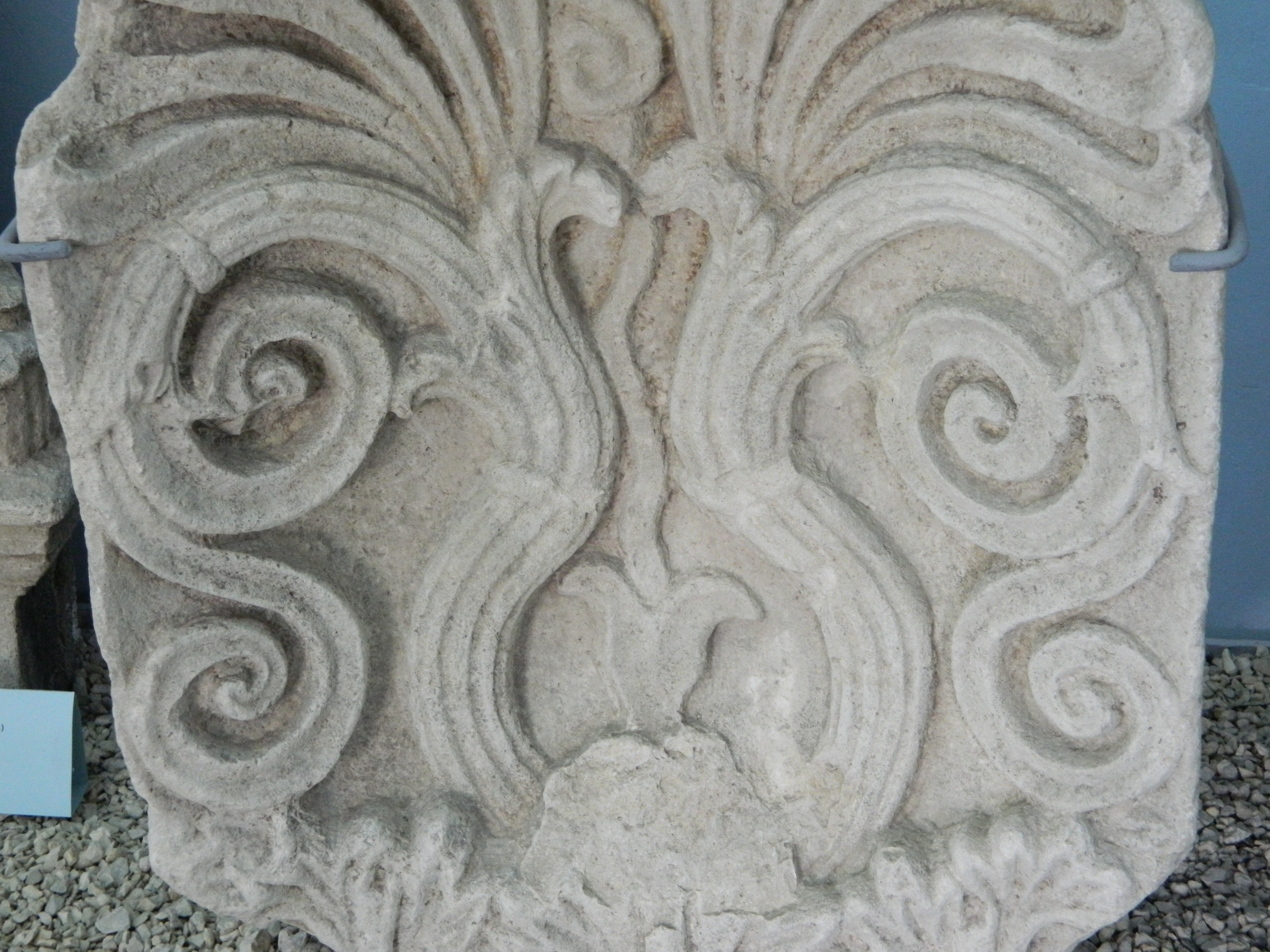
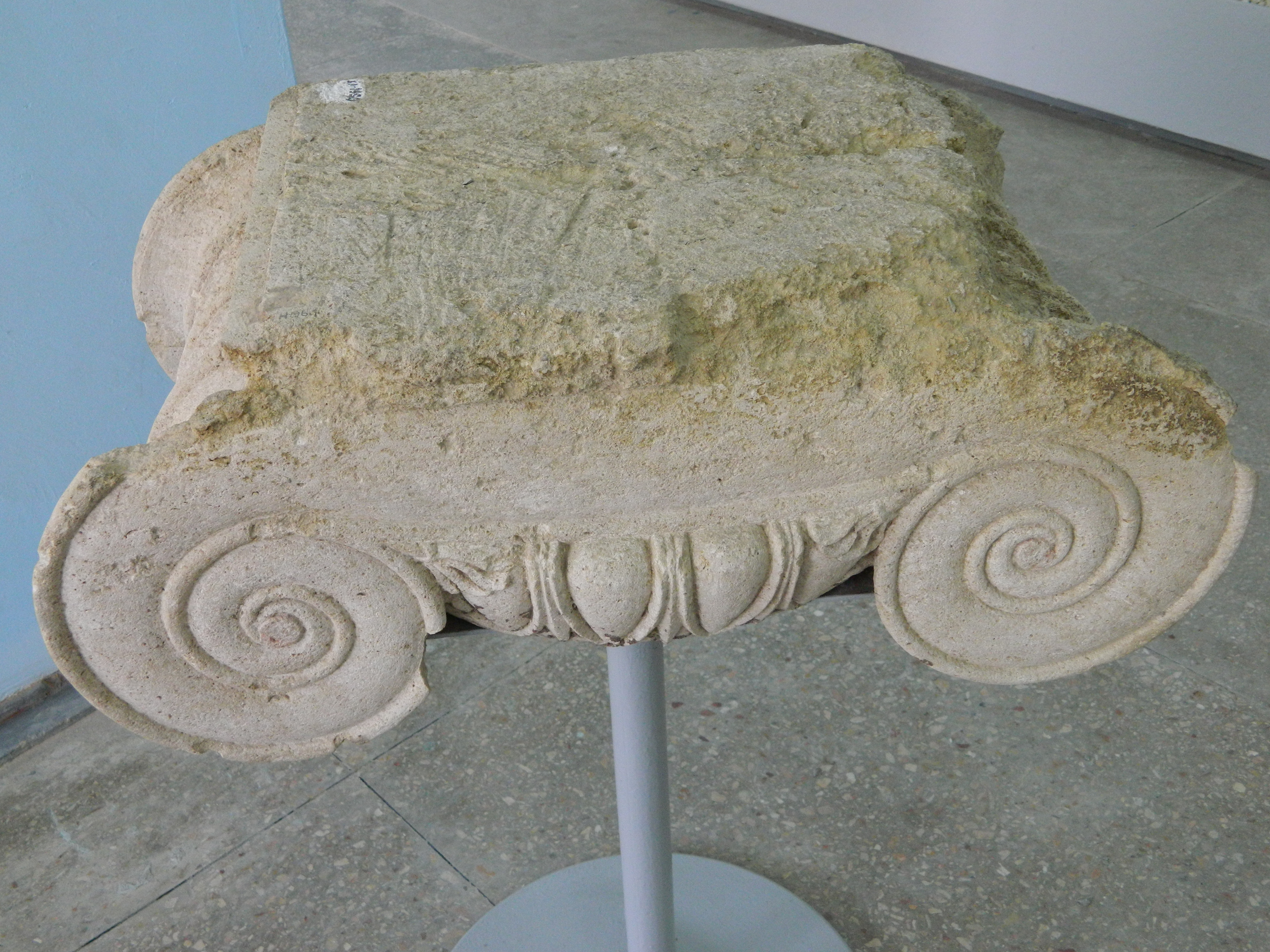

== Links ==
- Article about Lapidarium on the site of the Kerch Historical-cultural reserve(rus.eng.)
