= Lapidarium, Prague =

Part of a Czech museum

Coordinates: 50°6′19.94″N 14°25′53.35″E

Lapidarium of the National Museum
- Lapidárium Národního Muzea
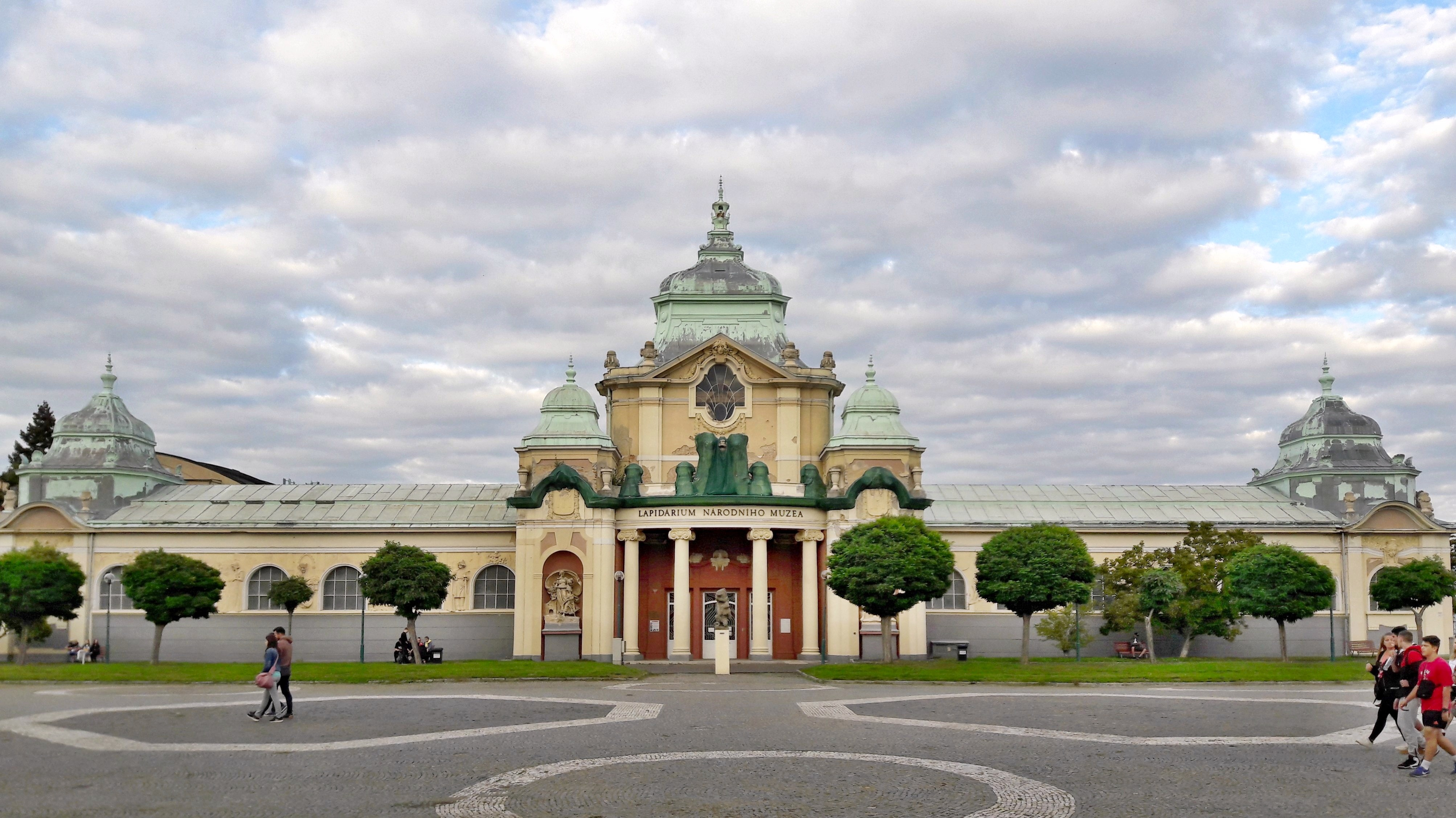
- Established: 1905
- Location: Prague, Czech Republic
- Type: Lapidarium
- Website: www.nm.cz

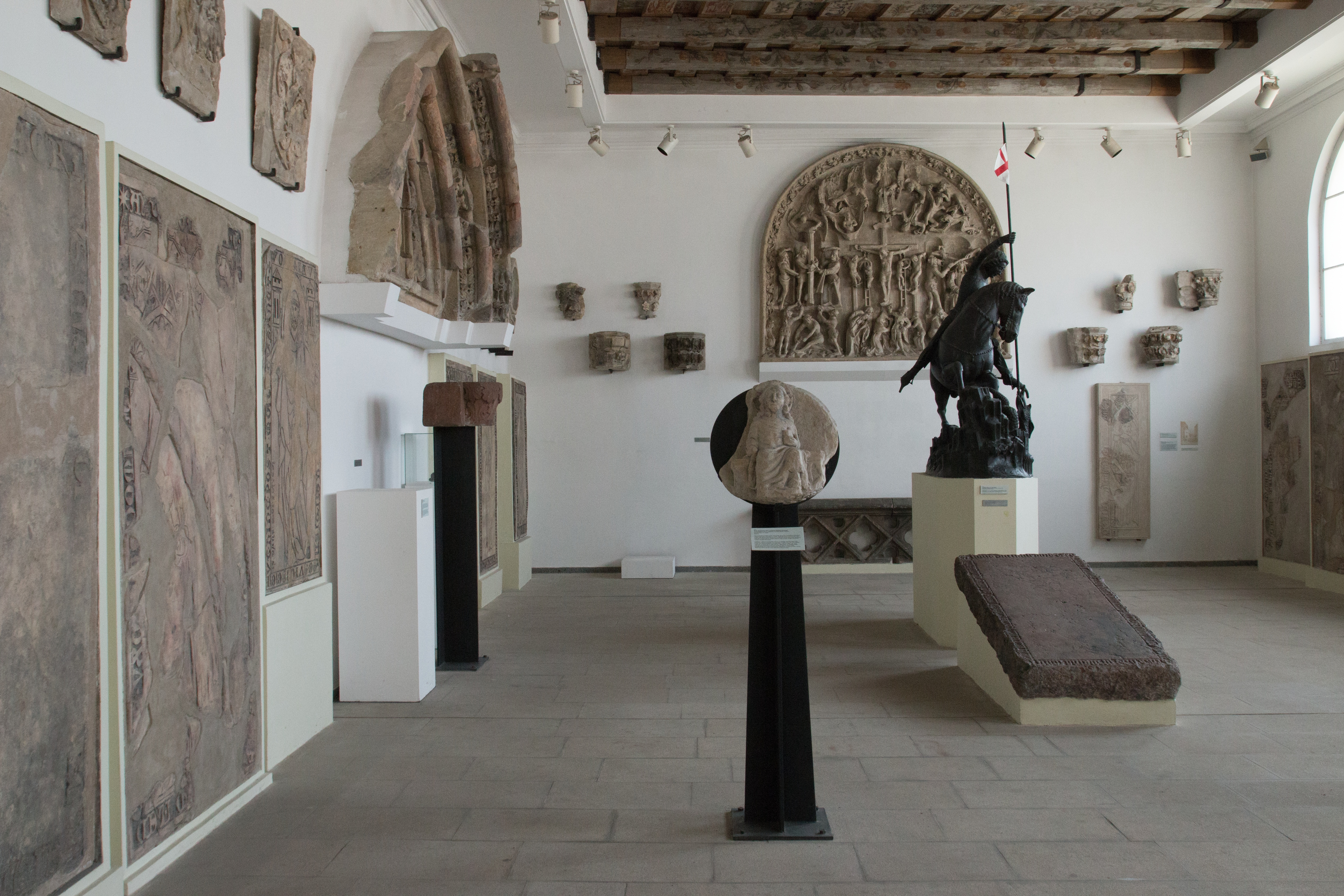
First Hall of medieval sculptures and building cells

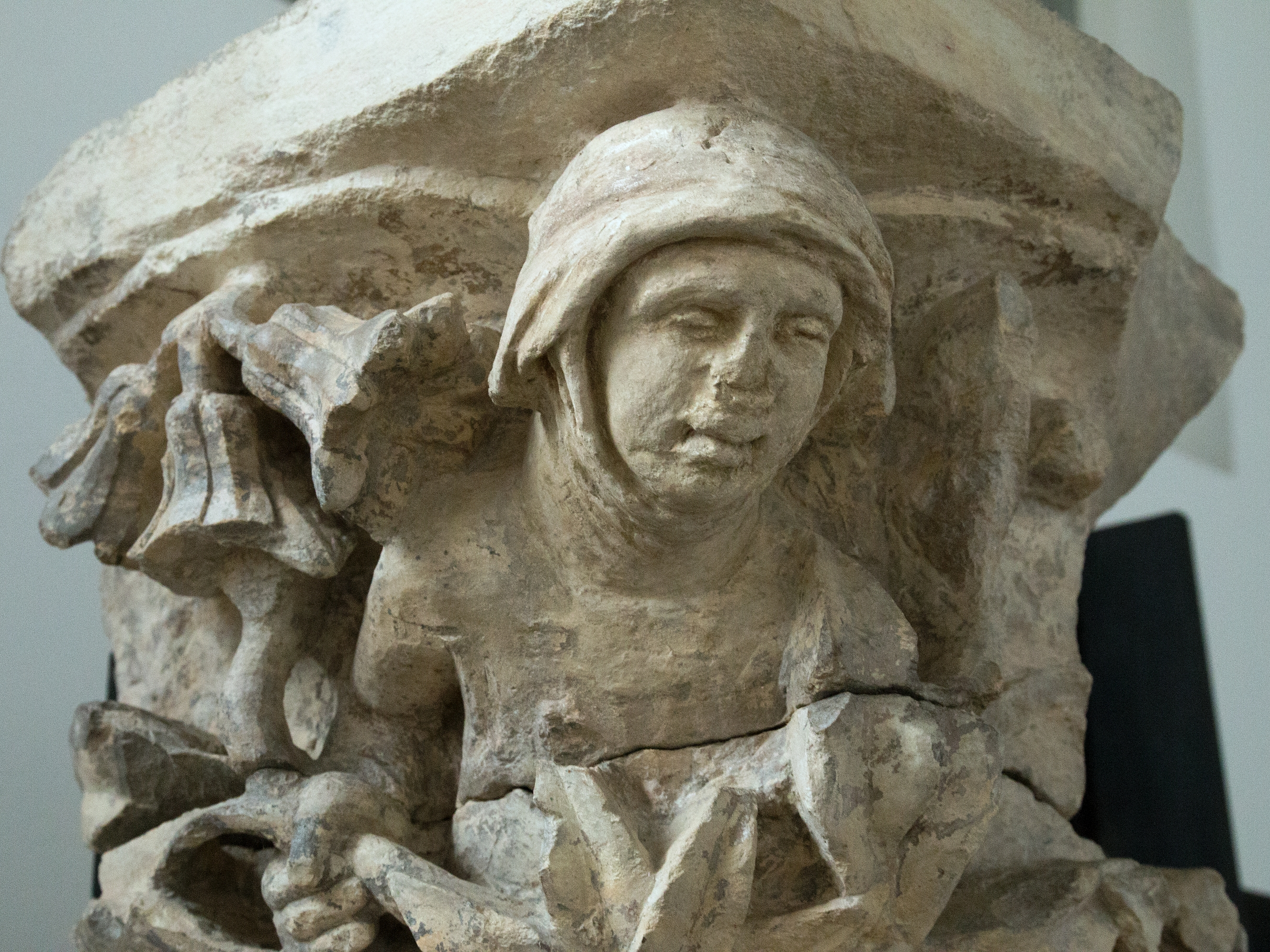
St Agnes of Bohemia, after 1261, from the church of St. Agnes Monastery in Prague

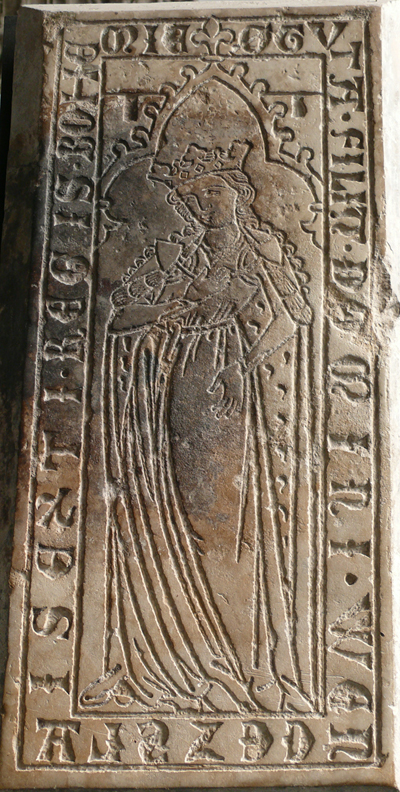
Tombstone of Guta, daughter of King Wenceslas II, 1286

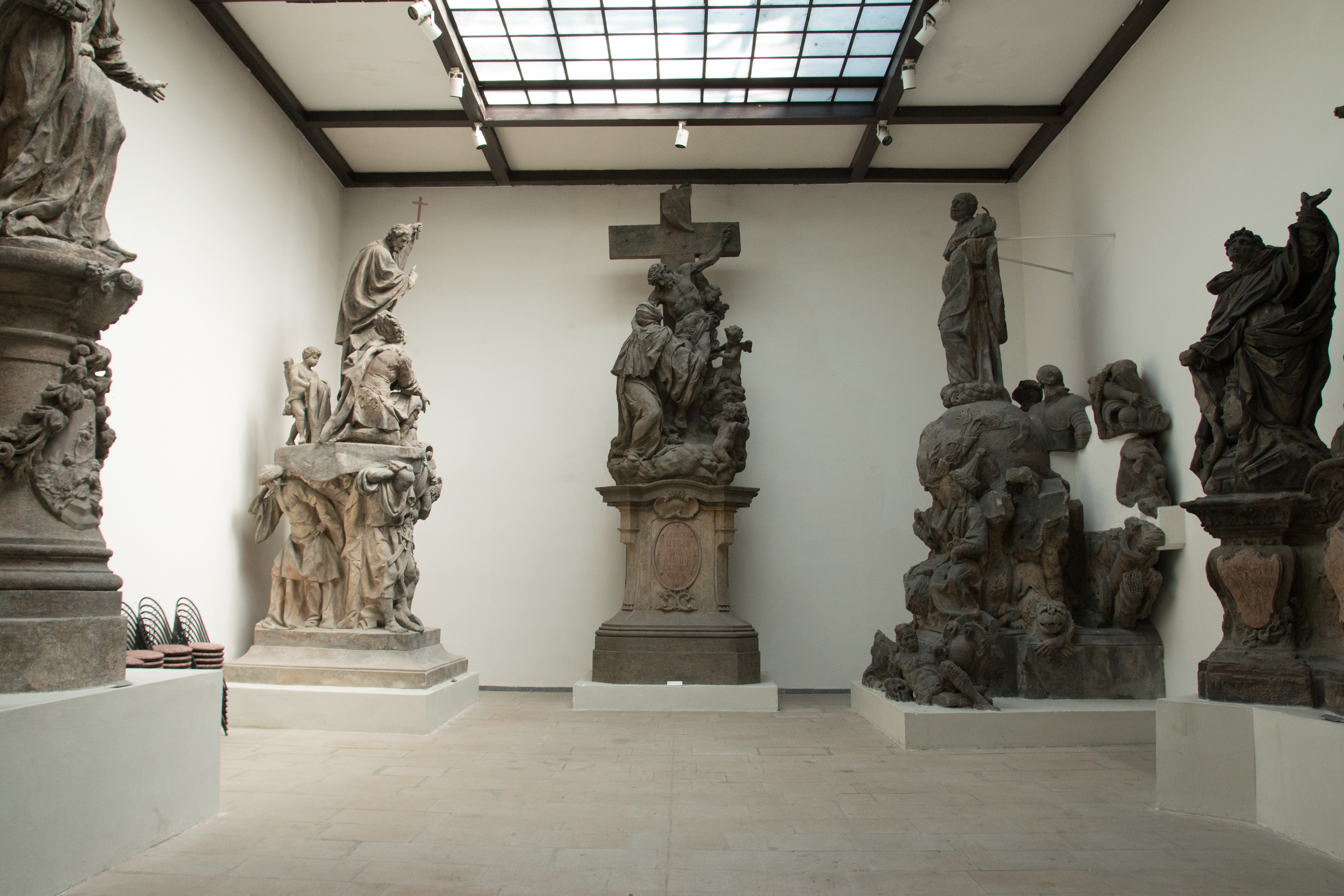
Baroque statues from Charles Bridge

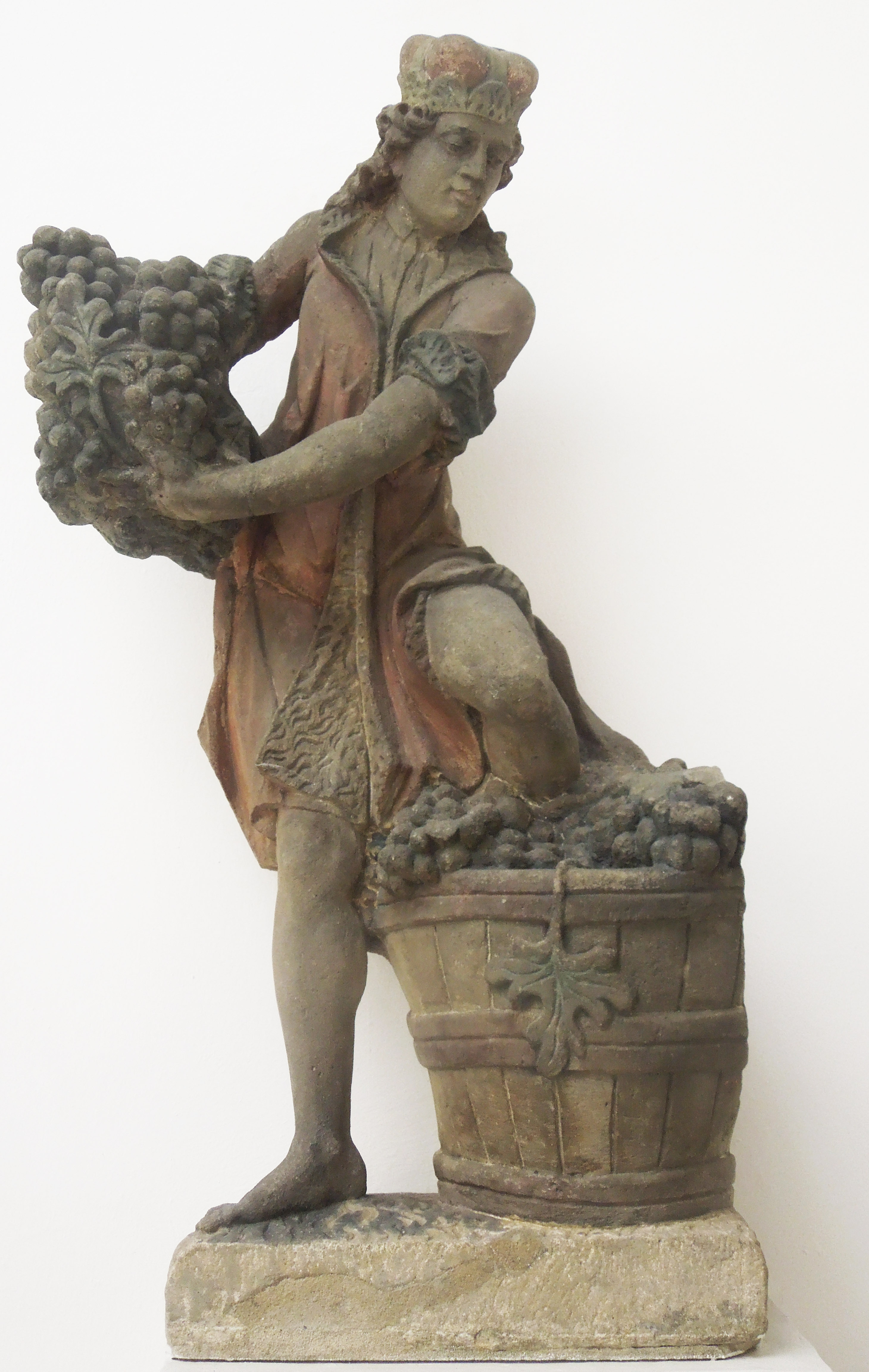
Jan Brokoff: St Wenceslas picking wine grapes

The Lapidarium is a lapidarium and a part of the National Museum in Prague, Czech Republic. It is the largest permanent exhibition of historical collections of stone sculpture, tombs and architectonical fragments originating from Bohemia, mostly from Prague.

== History ==
In 1839, František Palacký, an early supporter of the National Museum, advocated for collecting stone monuments and artifacts. In 1898, the precursor to the Lapidarium, the Exhibition of Monuments of Old Architecture and Exhibition of Architecture and Engineering, was held at the Výstaviště Praha. The exhibition's building was designed by architect Antonín Wiehl for the 1891 world's fair held in Prague and continues to house the museum today.

The first permanent exhibition in the Lapidarium was held in 1905. The museum closed from 1914 to 1932 due to World War I. The museum again closed from 1939 to 1954 because of World War II. The museum closed from 1967 to 1993 for renovations.

The Lapidarium houses valuable stone sculptures dating from the 11th to the early 20th century. The museum has a collection of around 2,000 artefacts, 400 of which are on permanent display in eight halls of approximative area of 1,300 square meters.

== Collections ==
=== Romanic and the early Gothic period ===
The oldest Romanic fragments from the crypt of St. Vitus basilica are dated to the late 11th century. Romanic stove tiles decorated with reliefs of lion, gryphon, sphinx or emperor Nero come from basilika on Prague-Vyšehrad. Eight tombstones with engraved figures of abbots as well as various architectural fragments of 11th to 13th century originate from the Benedictine abbey Ostrov (Insula), founded in 999 on the river Vltava near Prague and destroyed in 15th century; nearly 900 fragments were gained from the archaeological excavations in 1932.

=== High and Late Gothic period ===
Six original gothic statues from the Charles Bridge Tower (Emperor Charles IV, his son King Wenceslas IV, patron saints Vitus, Adalbert of Prague, Sigismundus and a lion can be seen here among others.

=== Renaissance ===
The Krocin's water fountain cut of rose marble comes from Old Town Square. It was moved to the museum between 1911 and 1914. Several tombstones come from destroyed Prague cemeteries.

=== Corridor of the Virgin Mary Pest Column ===
Fragments of Virgin Mary Immaculata among four archangels fighting with dragons, five statues of sandstone made by Johann Georg Bendl for the Old Town Square in Prague in 1650 after the idea of Emperor Ferdinand III (Maria Victoria). The column was overthrown by anarchists in 1918.

=== Hall of the Charles Bridge ===
Seven original baroque groups of statues include the largest monuments: Ecstase of sainte Ludgardis, made by Matthias Bernard Braun, St Francis Xaverius baptising Indians and The Apotheose of St Ignatius of Loyola by Ferdinand Maxmilian Brokoff, which fell into the river in 1890 and was never recovered.

=== Hall of the Bohemian high Baroque style ===
It houses the first statue of the Bohemian patron saint Wenceslas, made by Johann Georg Bendl in 1680 for the Horse Market (later Wenceslas Square). Another St Wenceslas statue shows the saint picking wine grapes for Holy mass. Six statues of saints comes from the facade of St Gallus Church. Two statues were made for Loretto Church in Prague - Hradčany.

=== Hall of the Rococo style and Historicism ===
Rococo is represented before all by a set of allegorical statues from the garden of a summer palace America projected by Kilian Ignac Dienzenhofer. Statues made by Ignac Platzer originate from the Palais Kinsky in Prague.

=== Hall of Habsburg' Emperors ===
Monuments of the Austrian emperors: Equestrian statue of Francis I and standing figure of Franz Joseph I were cast from brass for public spaces, as well as the monument of Field Marshal Joseph V. Radetzky von Radeč. Many of these monuments came to the Lapidarium after the World War I when reminders of the old Austro-Hungarian monarchy were removed from public space by the new republican authorities.

Busts of Franz Joseph I and his wife, Elisabeth (called Sisi) of white marble sculpted by Antonín Pavel Wagner in 1891 were moved after the general reconstruction back to the Pantheon of the National Museum (opened in September 2019).

== Awards ==
In 1995, the Lapidarium was named one of the ten most beautiful museum exhibitions in Europe.
