= Vid, Croatia =

Vid
- Village
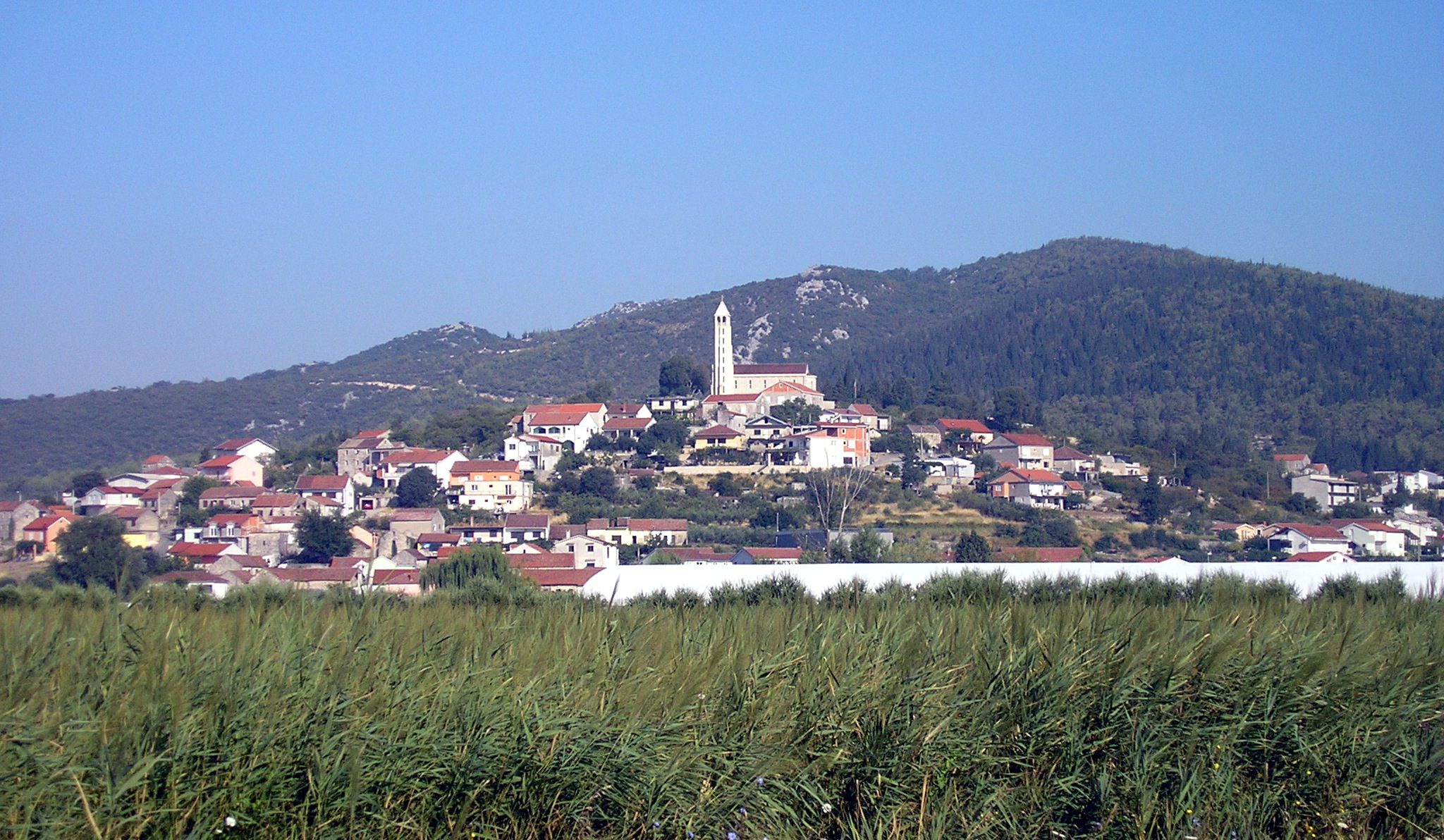
- August 2012 panorama of Vid

- Location within Croatia
- Country: Croatia
- County: Dubrovnik-Neretva County
- Municipality: Metković

Area
  - Total: 6.3 sq mi (16.2 km^{2})

Population (2021)
  - Total: 690
  - Density: 110/sq mi (43/km^{2})
- Time zone: UTC+1 (CET)
  - Summer (DST): UTC+2 (CEST)

Vid is a village in Dubrovnik-Neretva County, Croatia, administered as a part of the city of Metković.

It is famous for the ruins of the Roman city of Narona. It has a museum of Roman history in the region, called Archeological Museum of Narona.

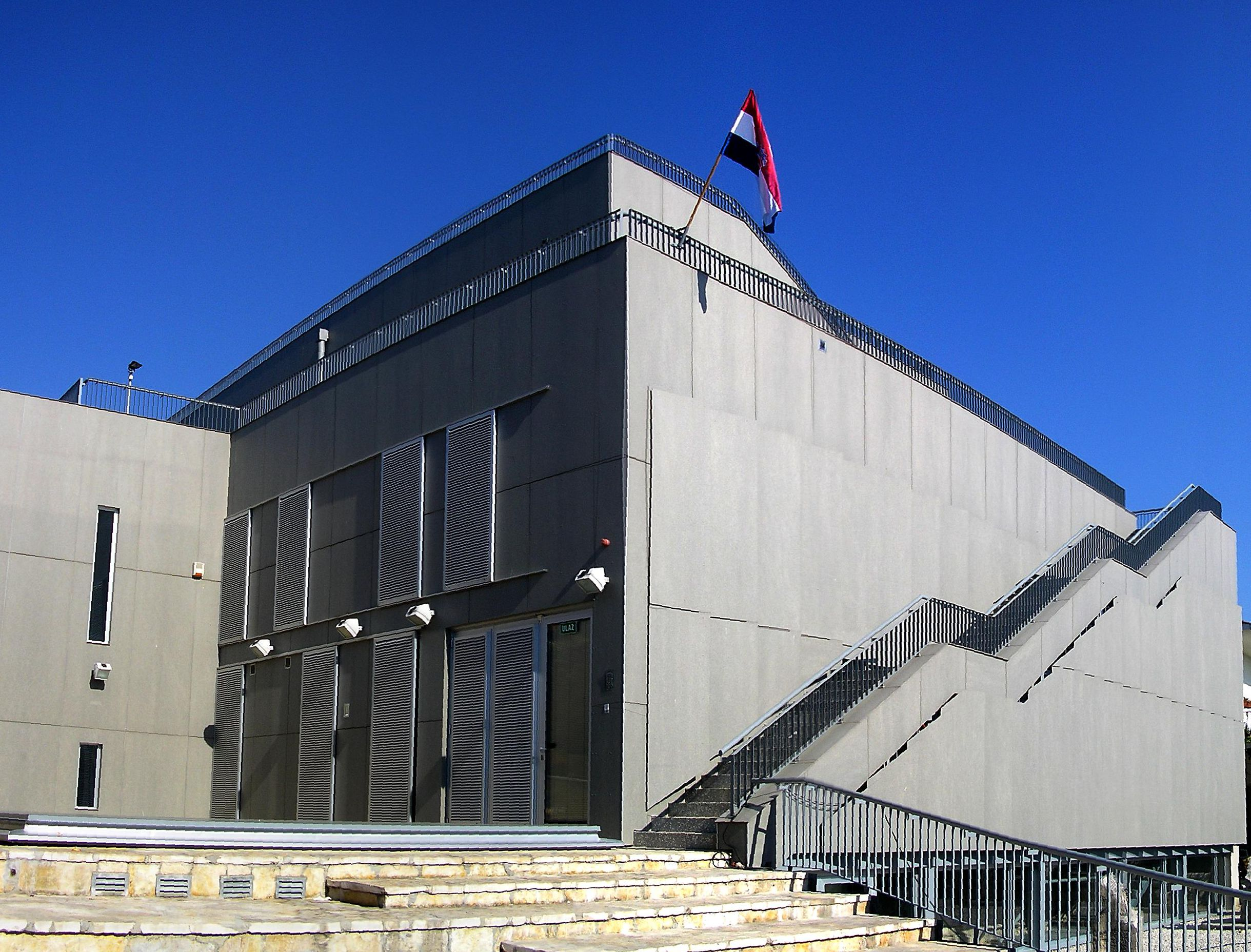
Archaeological museum of Narona

== Demographics ==
According to the 2021 census, its population was 690, while it was 796 in 2011.
