= Citrine =

Transparent, yellow variety of quartz

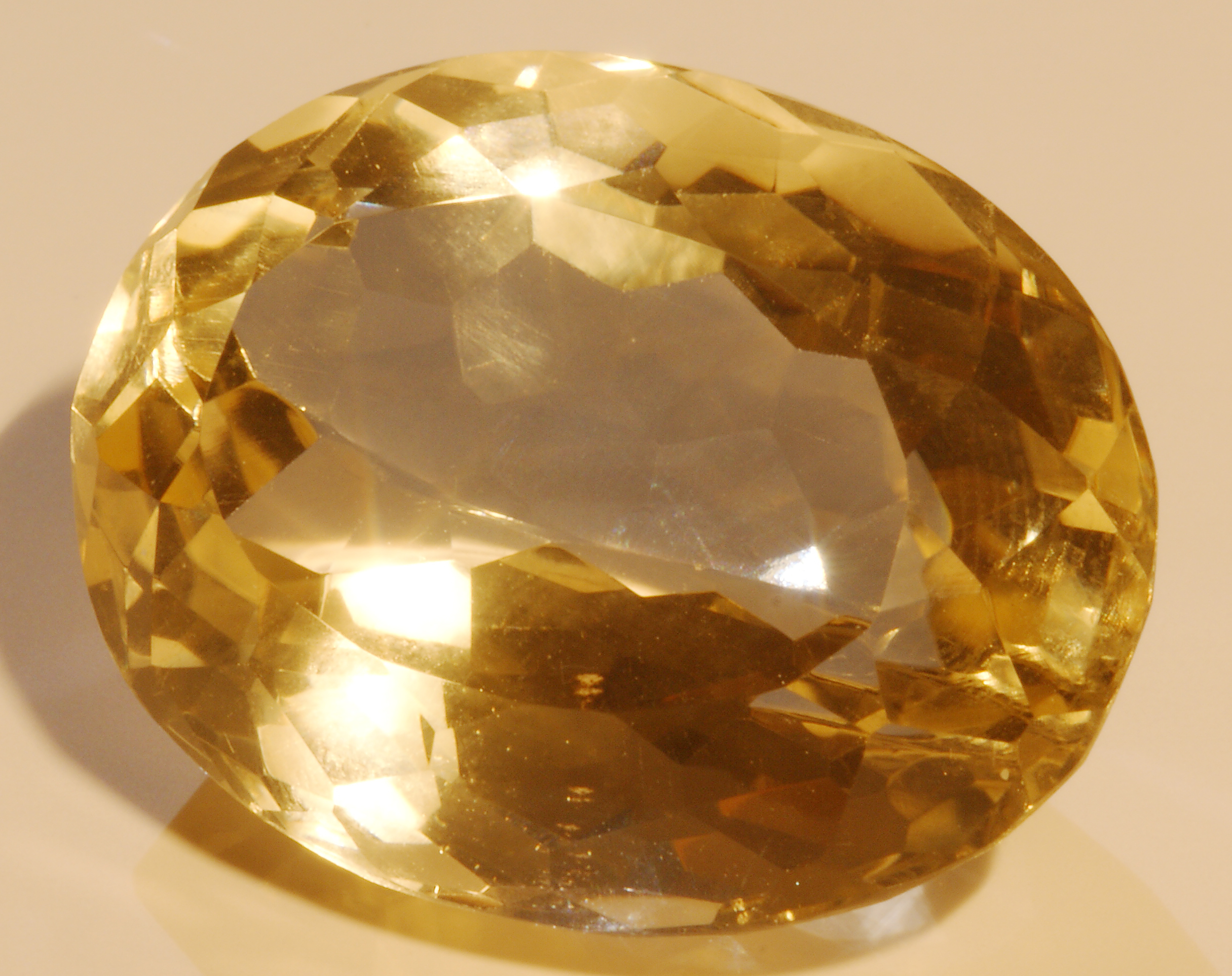
- Cut citrine from Brazil

General
- Category: Tectosilicate minerals
- Group: Quartz group
- Formula: Silica (silicon dioxide, SiO_{2})
- IMA symbol: Qz
- IMA status: Variety of quartz
- Strunz classification: 4.DA.05 (Oxides)
- Dana classification: 75.1.3.1 (Tectosilicates)
- Crystal system: Trigonal
- Crystal class: Trapezohedral (class 3 2)

Identification
- Color: Natural: pale yellow, with orange, green, or smoky hues Heat-treated amethyst: yellow-orange, orange-red, orange-brown
- Crystal habit: Hexagonal, massive Heat-treated amethyst only: druzy, geodes
- Twinning: Common: Dauphiné Law, Brazil Law, Japan Law
- Cleavage: None
- Fracture: Conchoidal
- Mohs scale hardness: 7
- Luster: Vitreous
- Streak: White
- Diaphaneity: Transparent to translucent
- Specific gravity: 2.65
- Optical properties: Uniaxial (+)
- Refractive index: 1.544-1.553
- Birefringence: 0.009
- Pleochroism: Natural: weak dichroism (different shades of yellow or orange); Heat-treated amethyst: none
- Dispersion: 0.013
- Common impurities: aluminium, iron

Citrine is a transparent, yellow variety of quartz. Its name is derived from the Latin word citrus (citron tree), by way of the French citrin or citron (lemon). Citrine is one of the most popular yellow gemstones and has been used since ancient Egyptian times. There is disagreement as to which trace elements are responsible for its color. Not all yellow quartz is considered citrine, such as quartz stained by iron inclusions or coatings. Natural citrine is rare; most commercially available "citrine" is produced by heating amethyst or smoky quartz.

== Color ==
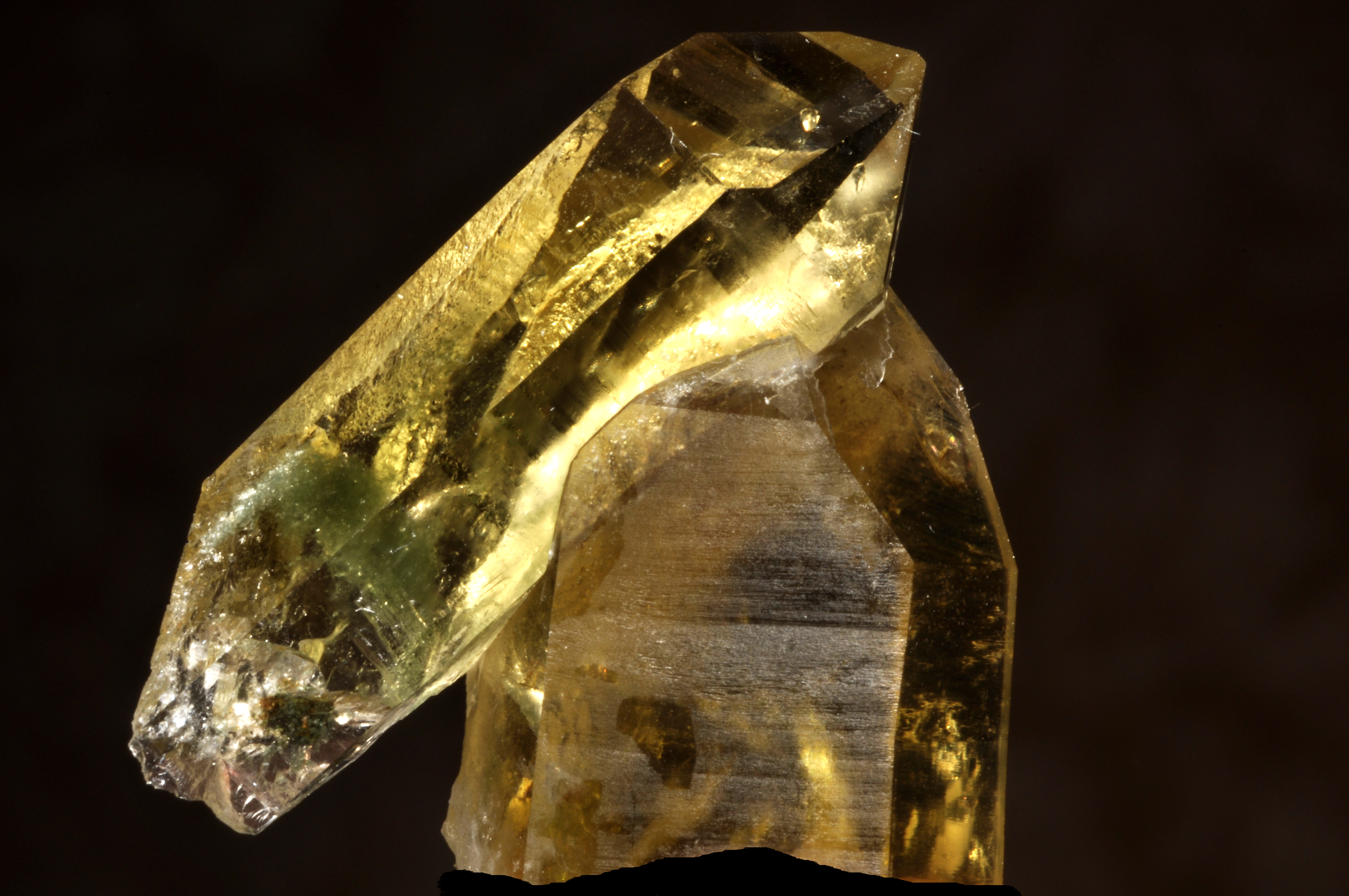
Twinned natural citrine crystals from Russia

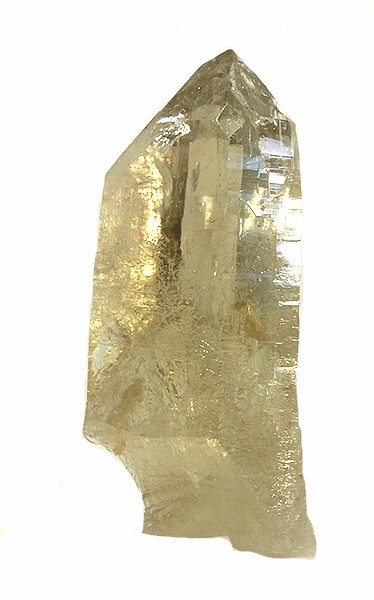
Natural citrine crystal from Brazil

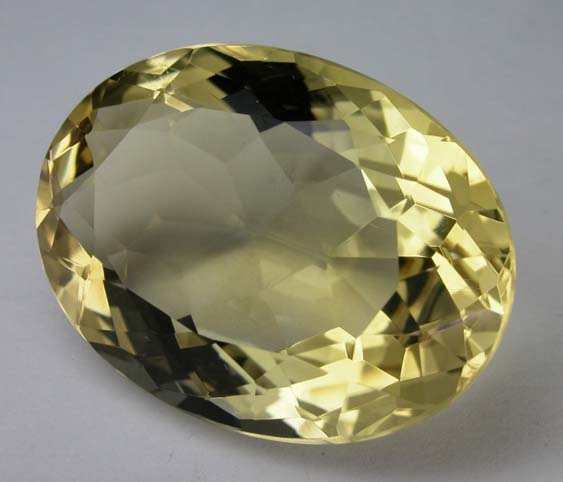
Cut natural citrine

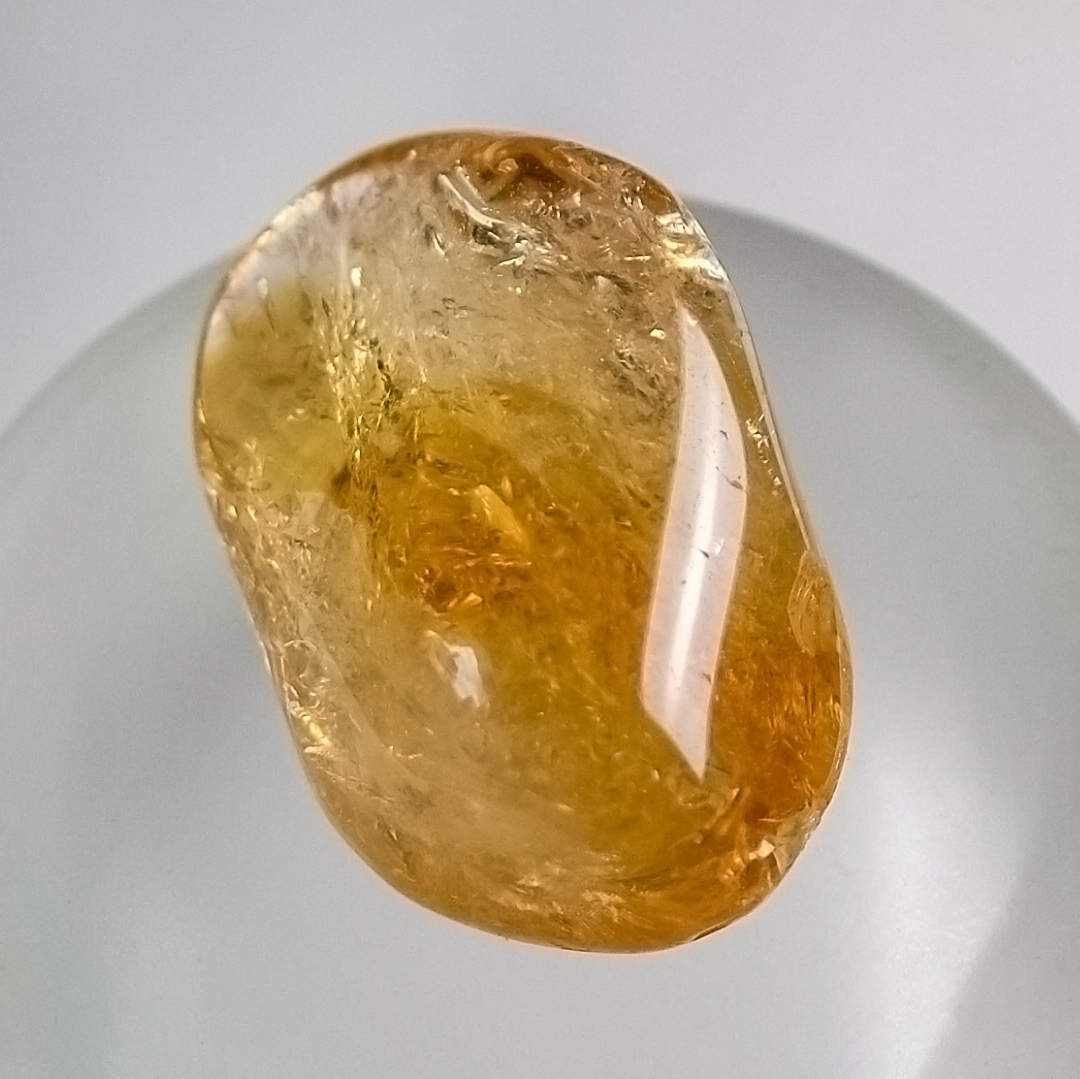
Tumbled "citrine" (heat-treated amethyst)

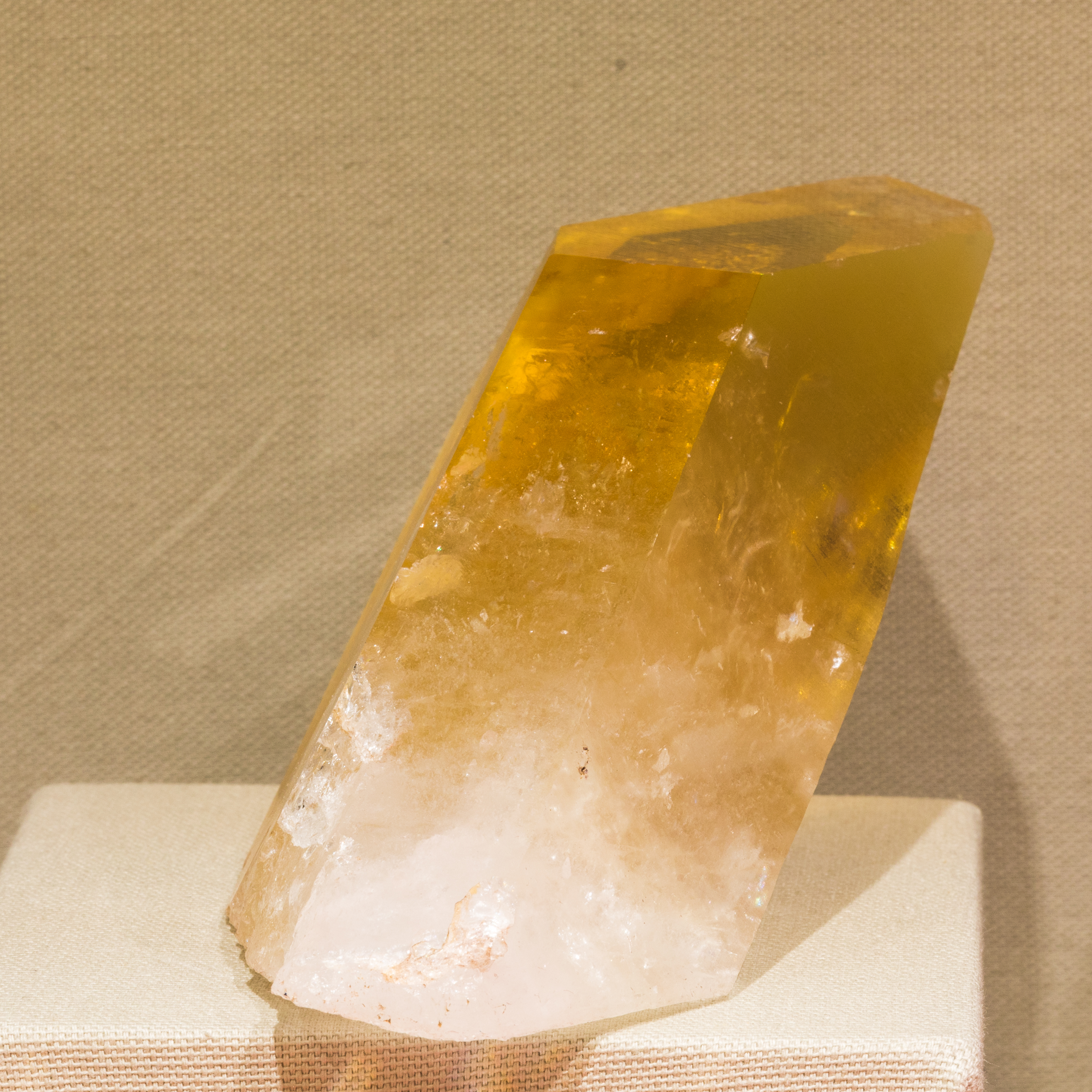
"Citrine" crystal (heat-treated amethyst)

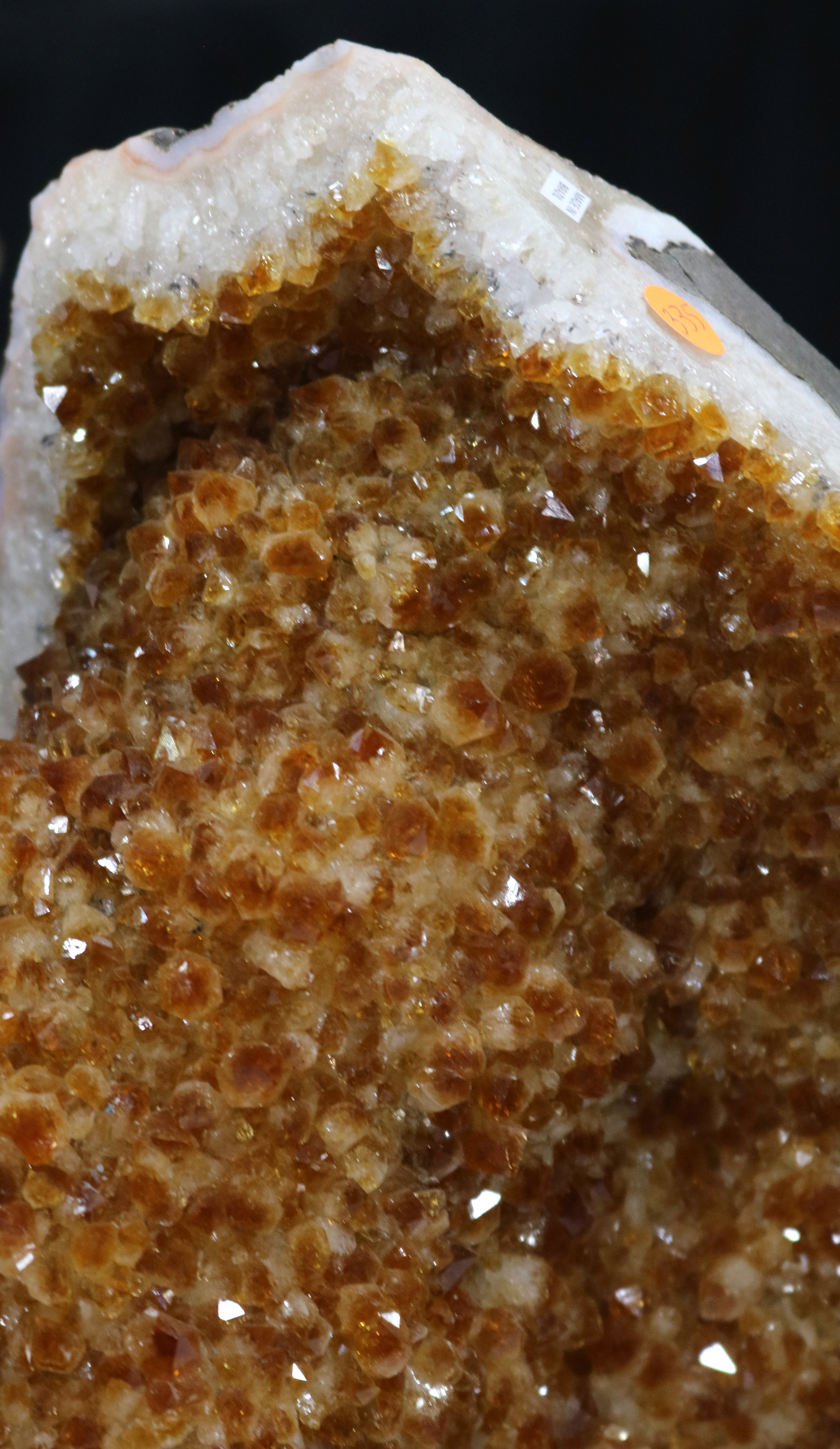
"Citrine" geode (heat-treated amethyst)

Natural citrine ranges in color from yellow to yellow-orange or yellow-green. The causes of its color are not well agreed upon. Evidence suggests the color of citrine is linked to the presence of aluminium-based color centers in its crystal structure, similar to smoky quartz. Citrine and smoky quartz occur in the same geological environments and can frequently be found together in the same crystal as smoky citrine. Alternatively, it has been suggested that the color of citrine may be due to trace amounts of iron; many sources claim iron oxides as the source of citrine's color. However, synthetic crystals grown in iron-rich solutions have failed to replicate the color or dichroism of natural citrine. The ultraviolet sensitivity of natural citrine further indicates that its color is not caused solely by trace elements.

Citrine is very rare in nature; most "citrine" on the market is actually heat-treated amethyst and is therefore not true citrine according the strict mineralogical definition. Amethyst loses its natural violet color when heated to above 200–300 °C (392–572 °F). Natural citrine tends to be pale in color, while heat-treated amethyst is typically a deeper yellow, orange, red, or even brown; the latter is sometimes referred to as burnt amethyst. Unlike natural citrine, the color of heat-treated amethyst is known to come exclusively from trace amounts of iron oxides, specifically hematite and goethite. This iron was present in the original amethyst and oxidized by the heating process. Heat-treated amethyst, like synthetic crystals, does not exhibit the dichroism of natural citrine. Smoky quartz can also be heat treated to resemble citrine; smoky quartz is naturally dichroic, and heat-treated smoky quartz retains its dichroism.

Amethyst with a certain iron content can be heated to produce madeira citrine, which has a deep orange color and exhibits red flashes. Its name comes from madeira, the Brazilian word for wood. Clear quartz can also be irradiated to produce lemon quartz, which has a neon yellow to yellow-green color.

== Differentiation ==
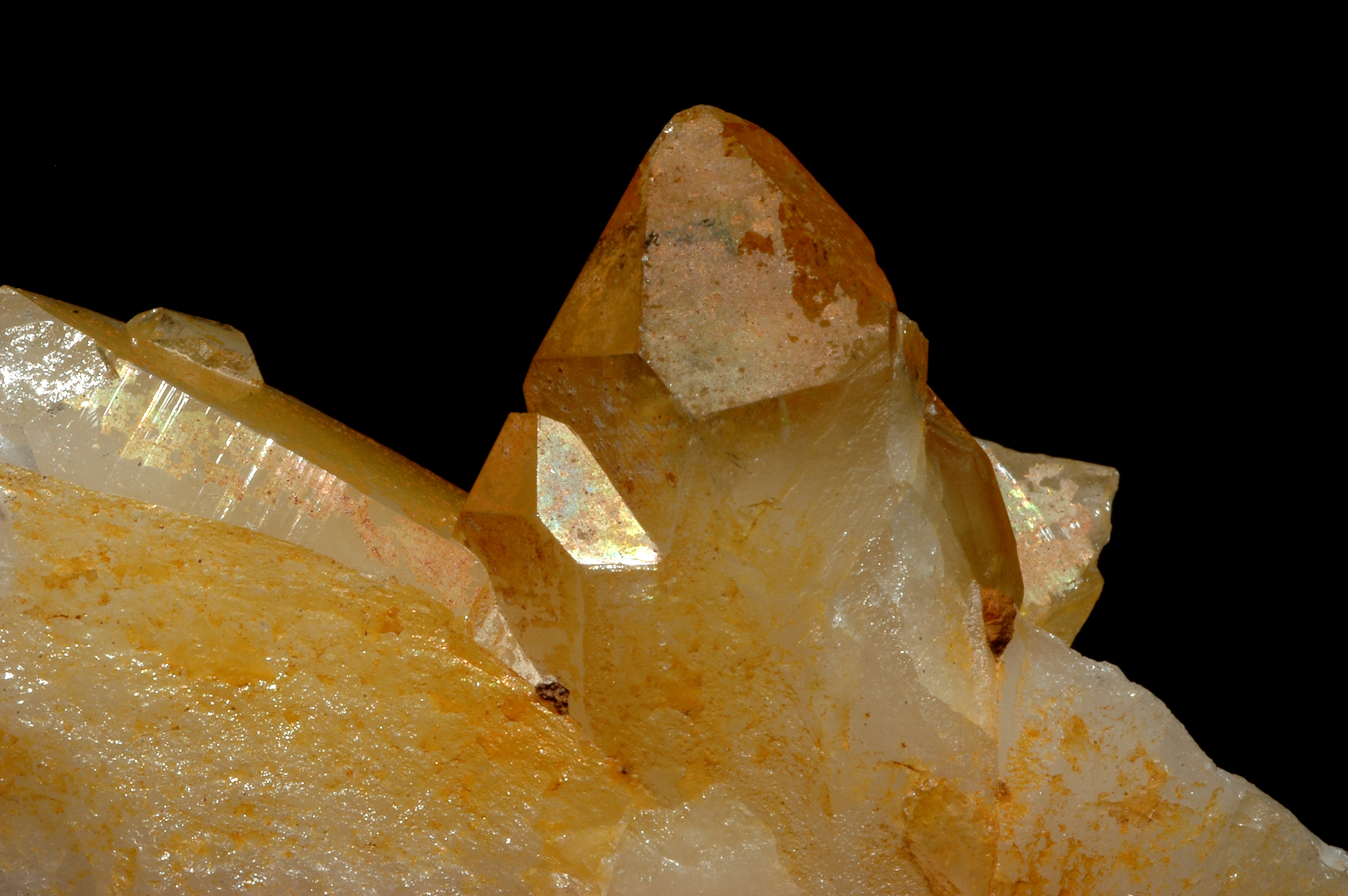
Quartz from Brazil with visible surface staining, sometimes incorrectly identified as citrine

Clear quartz with natural iron inclusions or limonite staining may resemble citrine. However, these crystals will either have coloration only on the surface or in certain spots (inclusions) within the crystal. Quartz that derives its color from coatings or inclusions is not considered citrine.

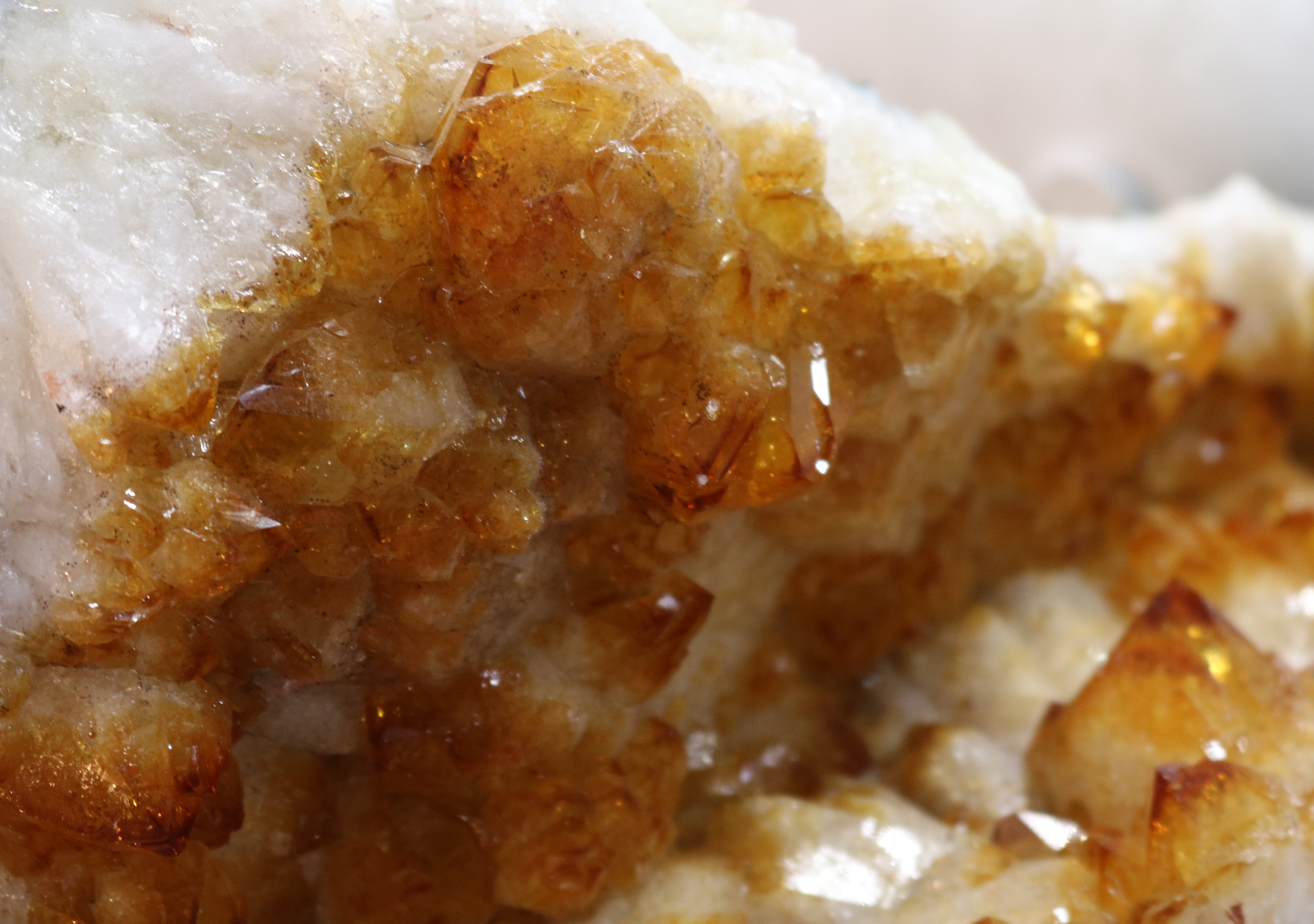
Heat-treated amethyst geode showing color zoning

Like natural amethyst, heat-treated amethyst often exhibits color zoning, or uneven color distribution throughout the crystal. In geodes, the color is usually deepest near the tips of the crystals and white near their base. Natural citrine may have smoky zones or phantoms, but "citrine" geodes and geode segments are usually heat-treated amethyst.

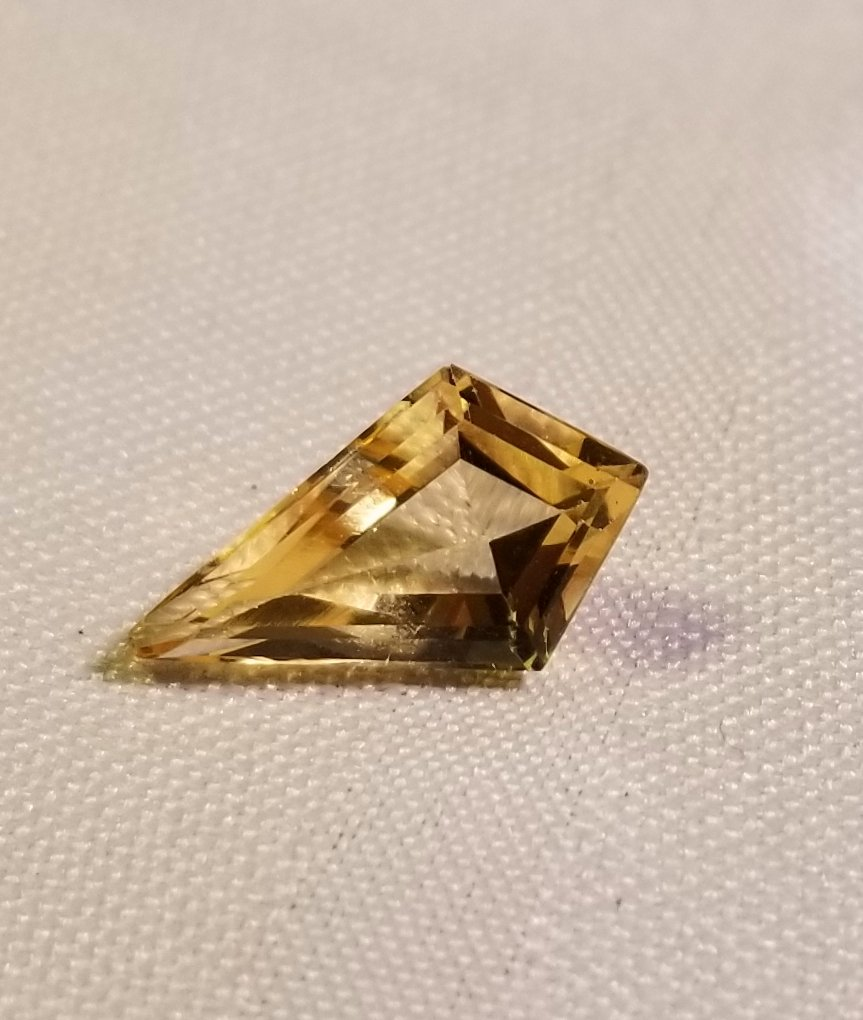
Cut yellow topaz, which resembles citrine in color

It can be difficult to differentiate between cut citrine and yellow topaz visually, but they differ in hardness. All quartz varieties have a hardness of 7 on the Mohs scale, while topaz has a hardness of 8.

Citrine can also be difficult to distinguish from yellow scapolite, although citrine is much more common as a gemstone. They can be distinguished by their pleochroism: citrine is weakly dichroic, while scapolite is moderately to strongly pleochroic. Scapolite also usually has higher birefringence.

== Localities ==
Most citrine, both natural and that derived from amethyst, originates from Brazil. Natural citrine can also be found in Russia and Madagascar. Uruguay, Zambia, Madagascar, and the Brazilian state of Rio Grande do Sul are the leading producers of madeira citrine. Other notable sources of citrine include Bolivia, the Democratic Republic of the Congo, Mexico, Myanmar, Namibia, Peru, South Africa, and the United States.

== Uses and history ==
Quartz and its varieties have been used as gemstones for thousands of years. Citrine and other quartzes are believed to have been used by ancient Egyptians to make talismans, by ancient Greeks for carving symbols, and by Roman priests as rings. Queen Victoria was reportedly fond of the gemstone, and many brooches and pendants featuring citrine survive from this era.

In the centuries before modern mineralogy, citrine was frequently confused with topaz, and in fact it was common in many cultures to use the name topaz for any golden yellow stone. The name citrine was first used in English in the 14th century. Citrine has been referred to as the "merchant's stone" or "money stone", due to a superstition that it would bring prosperity.

Today, citrine is the top-selling yellow-orange gemstone, and it is commonly used in jewelry. It has become more popular over the last few decades due to aggressive marketing tactics and earth-tone fashion trends. Citrine is sometimes used as a modern, more affordable alternative to the traditional November birthstone, yellow topaz.

== See also ==
- Ametrine
- List of minerals
