= Ametrine =

Quartz variety

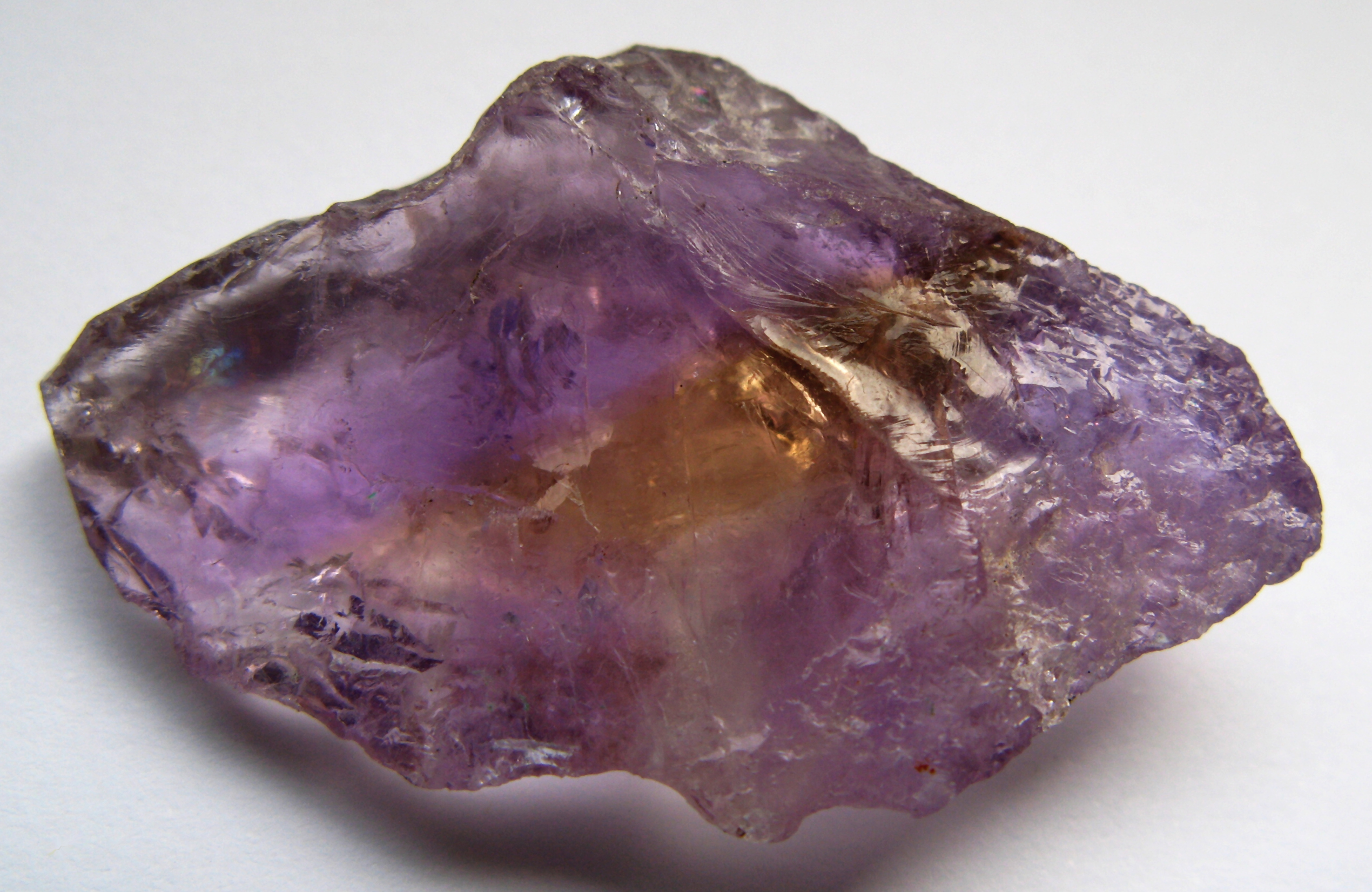
- Ametrine from Bolivia

General
- Category: Tectosilicate minerals
- Group: Quartz group
- Formula: Silica (silicon dioxide, SiO_{2})
- IMA status: Variety of quartz
- Crystal system: Trigonal

Identification
- Formula mass: 60.08 g/mol
- Color: Purple, yellow to orange
- Crystal habit: 6-sided prism ending in 6-sided pyramid (typical)
- Twinning: Dauphine law and Brazil law
- Cleavage: none
- Fracture: Conchoidal
- Mohs scale hardness: 7
- Lustre: Vitreous
- Streak: white
- Diaphaneity: Transparent to translucent
- Specific gravity: 2.65
- Optical properties: Unixal (+)
- Refractive index: n_{ω} = 1.543–1.553 n_{ε} = 1.552–1.554
- Birefringence: +0.009
- Pleochroism: Amethyst section shows weak to moderate purple/reddish purple "Citrine" section shows very weak yellow/orange
- Melting point: 1650±75 °C
- Diagnostic features: Distinct segments that are purple and yellow
- Solubility: Insoluble in common solvents
- Common impurities: Iron

Ametrine, also known as trystine, golden amethyst, or by the trade name bolivianite, is a variety of quartz with alternating zones of purple and yellow-orange coloration. Its name is a portmanteau of amethyst and citrine. While ametrine is commonly referred to as a combination of these two quartz varieties, some sources claim this is not accurate. Almost all commercially available ametrine is mined in Bolivia.

== Color ==
Ametrine, as its name suggests, is commonly believed to be a combination of citrine and amethyst in the same crystal. However, sources do not agree that the yellow-orange quartz component of ametrine may properly be called citrine. Like the purple color of amethyst, the yellow color in ametrine originates from trace amounts of iron in the crystal structure. The difference in coloration is due to the iron existing in different oxidation states. The yellow segments have been oxidized by heat, while the amethyst segments remain unoxidized. Some sources define citrine solely as quartz with its color originating from aluminum-based color centers, similar to those of smoky quartz. This definition excludes any amethyst that has been oxidized by heat. Accordingly, the yellow quartz in ametrine would not be considered true citrine.

== Origin ==
Naturally occurring ametrine is sourced almost exclusively from a single mine in Bolivia. Deposits also exist in Brazil and India. The different oxidation states occur due to there being a temperature gradient across the crystal during its formation. However, most ametrine on the market is created by partially heating or irradiating amethyst.

Ametrine in the low price segment may stem from synthetic material. Green-yellow or golden-blue ametrine does not exist naturally. Synthetic ametrine is grown with the hydrothermal method using solutions doped with specific elements, followed by irradiation of the created crystals.

== Structure ==
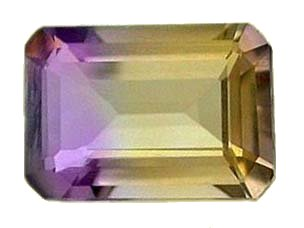
Ametrine Emerald Cut

Ametrine is composed of silicon dioxide (SiO_{2}) and it is a tectosilicate, which means it has a silicate framework linked together through shared oxygen atoms.

== History ==
Legend has it that ametrine was first introduced to Europe by a conquistador's gifts to the Spanish Queen in the 1600s, after he received a mine in Bolivia as a dowry when he married a princess from the native Ayoreos tribe.

== See also ==
- List of minerals
