= Grape agate =

Botryoidal form of quartz

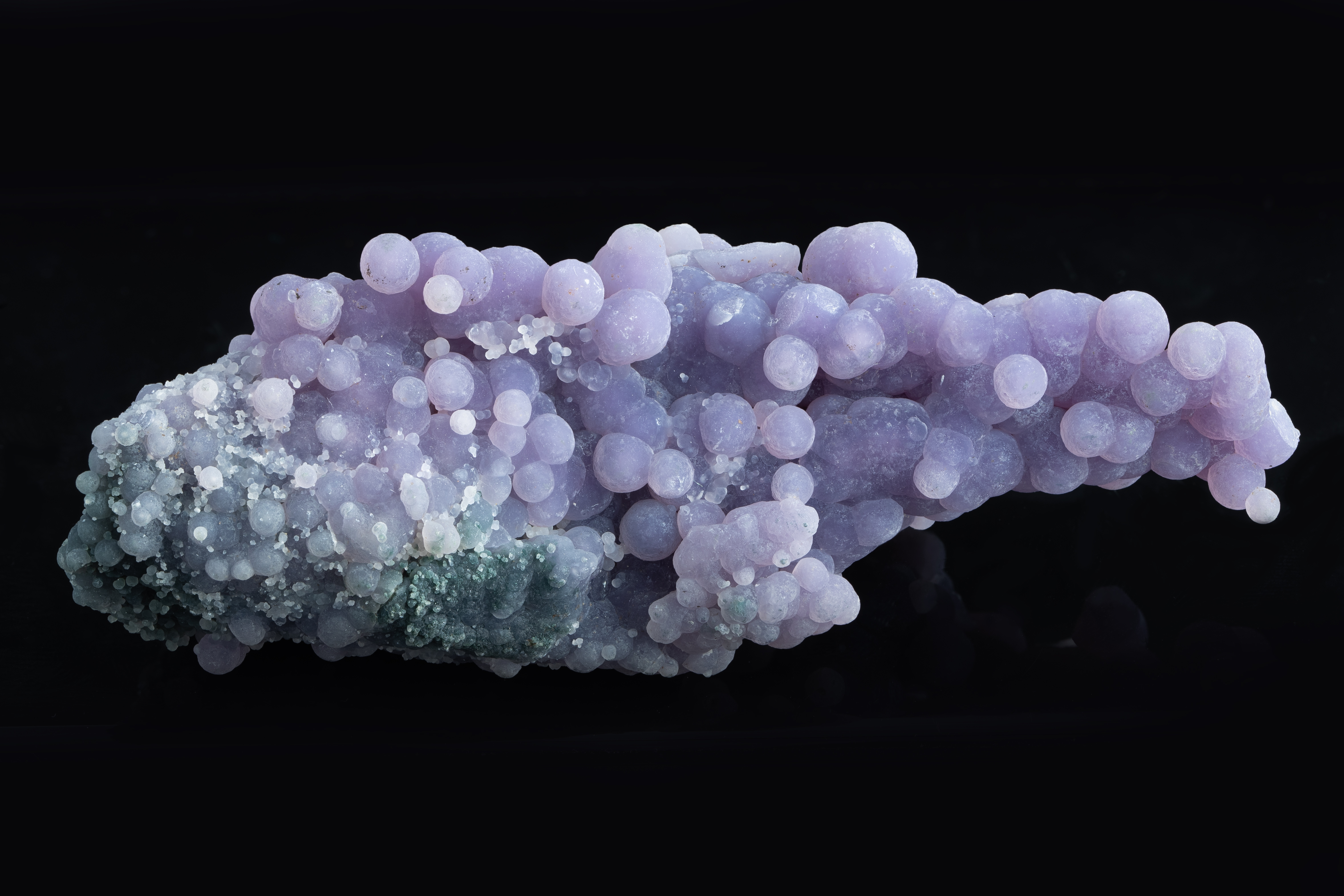
- Grape agate from Mamuju Regency, West Sulawesi Province, Indonesia

General
- Category: Tectosilicate minerals
- Group: Quartz group
- Formula: SiO_{2}
- IMA status: Variety of quartz
- Crystal system: Trigonal

Identification
- Color: 90% gray, brown, or colorless; 8% purple; 1.5% green or blue-green; rarely blue, pink, or white
- Crystal habit: Botryoidal
- Cleavage: Poor
- Fracture: Conchoidal
- Tenacity: Brittle
- Mohs scale hardness: 7
- Luster: Dull to vitreous
- Streak: White
- Diaphaneity: Translucent to opaque
- Specific gravity: 2.65-2.66
- Optical properties: Uniaxial (+)
- Common impurities: Iron, magnesium, calcium

Grape agate, also called grape chalcedony or grape amethyst, is a botryoidal variety of quartz that occurs as clusters of small spheres. Specimen- and gem-quality material is usually purple and sometimes blue-green. Grape agate was discovered in 2014 in West Sulawesi, Indonesia and first entered the global market in 2016. It derives its name from its appearance resembling a bunch of grapes. Despite its common trade name, grape agate is not agate because it lacks banding. Grape agate has been described as a form of chalcedony, but it is actually a form of macrocrystalline quartz (amethyst when purple).

== Description ==
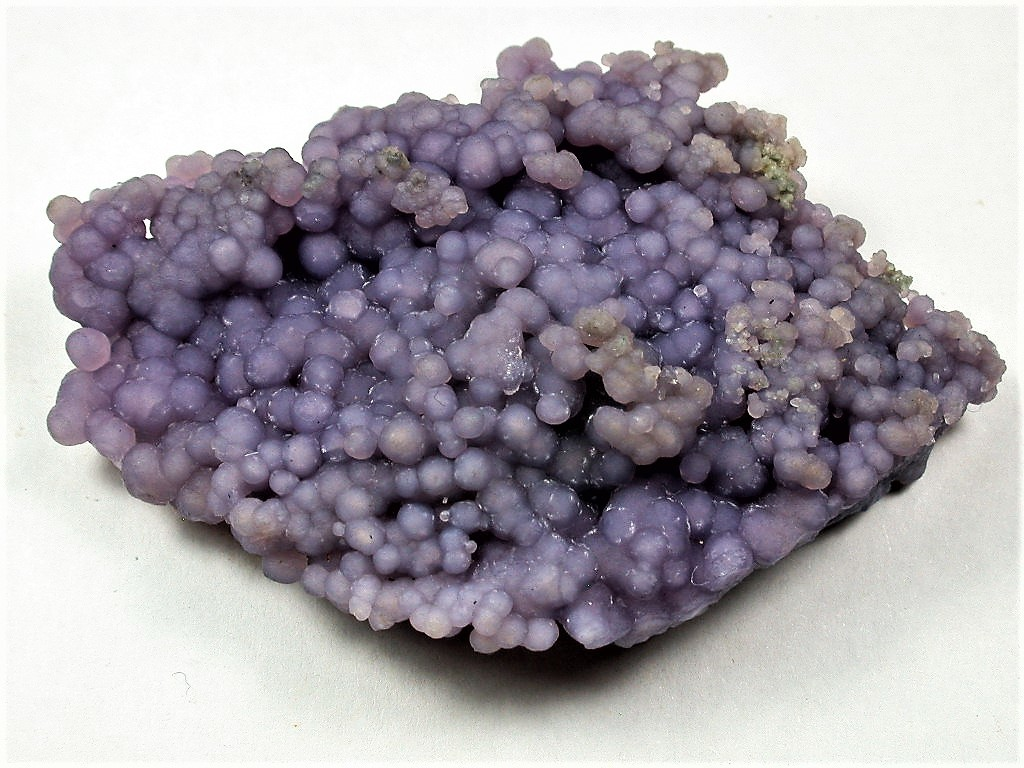
Purple grape agate

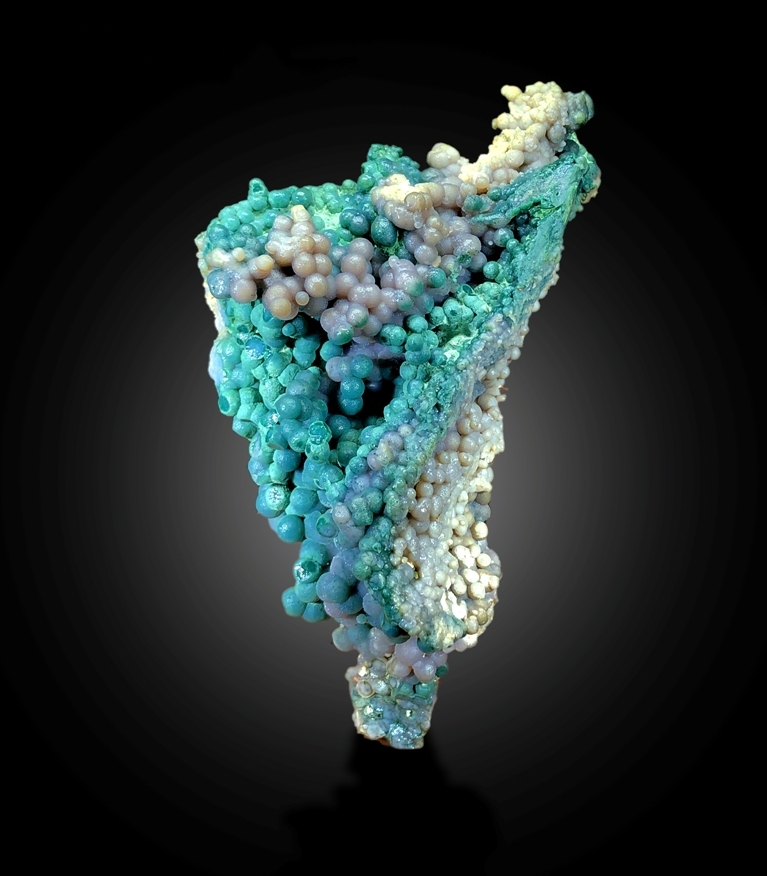
Blue-green and purple grape agate

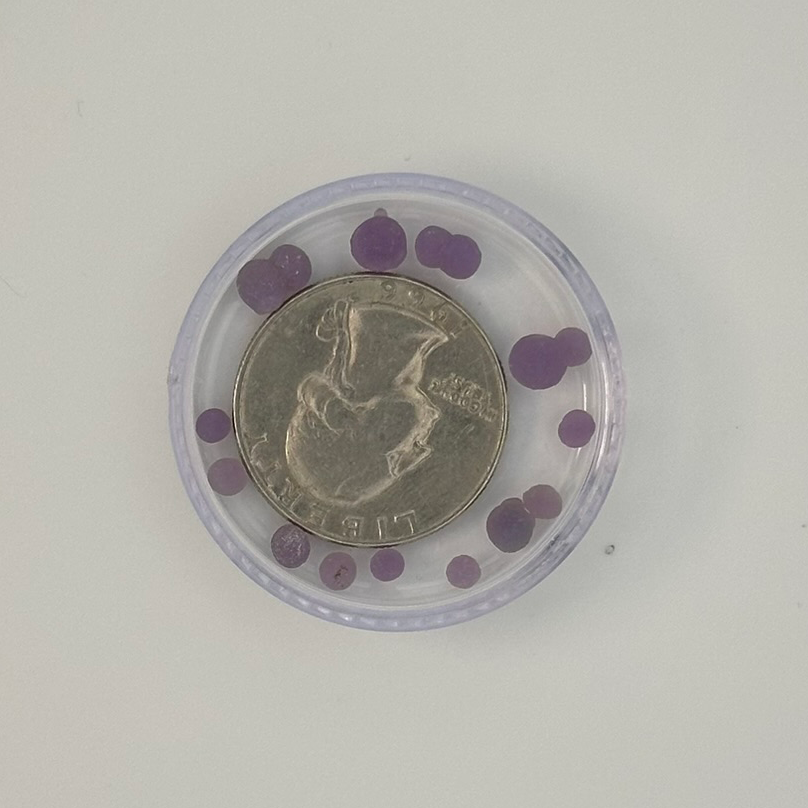
Single and double spheres of grape agate with a US quarter (roughly 1 in or 25 mm)

Grape agate typically occurs as clusters of spherical crystal growths, some weighing up to 80 kilograms (180 lb). Single and double spheres can also be found. The average diameter of each individual sphere is 3–6 millimeters (0.12–0.24 in), rarely reaching up to 18 millimeters (0.71 in). Many are coated in druzy quartz, giving them a sparkling appearance, while others are smooth. The vast majority of grape agate found is dull-colored, with only about 10% occurring in attractive colors. Of this, approximately 80% is purple, 15% is green or blue-green, and 5% is blue, pink, or white. Multiple colors may occur together in the same cluster.

== Origin and discovery ==
The first pieces of grape agate were discovered in 2014 in West Sulawesi on Sulawesi Island, Indonesia. They were initially found on a beach at Pantai Ngalo, some 25 kilometres (16 miles) south of Mamuju city. Locals gave the stone the name batu Manakarra ("Manakarra stone") or simply Manakarra, after the name of a well-known beach in Mamuju. This name may have been chosen by an early dealer as an attempt to conceal the true origin of the stone from potential competitors.

This initial material was fragile and mostly dull brown to gray in color, making it largely unsuitable for collectors and lapidary use. Miners began following streams from the beach north up into the mountains, finding additional deposits along the streams. By 2016, less weathered, shinier, purple and blue-green stones had been found near Takandeang in Tapalang district, Mamuju Regency. Subsequently, this higher-quality material began to be sold as collector's specimens and lapidary material at rock shops, mineral shows, and online marketplaces.

== Geology ==
Grape agate is mined from pockets of blue-green clay located between weathered pillow lavas. These lavas are porphyries of Miocene age and believed to have an intermediate composition of trachyte and andesite. They are associated with mafic volcanic rocks including basalt, breccias, and tuffs.

Pillow lavas form when lava cools rapidly from underwater fissures. According to geologist Joel Ivey, this likely formed a layer of volcanic glass, which is high in silica, around the lava pillows. Hydrothermal fluids dissolved silica from this glass and gradually decomposed the lava into a magnesium- and calcium-rich clay, filling the spaces between the pillows. Eventually, silica precipitated out of solution to form quartz spherulites within the clay, which settled and bonded together to form clusters. Some individual spheres can also be found on top of the clay.

== Structure and composition ==
Grape agate is a form of quartz (silica, SiO_{2}) with a botryoidal crystal habit, meaning "having the form of a bunch of grapes." Each grape agate sphere is a radial spherulite structure, an aggregate of small, fibrous quartz crystals twisted along their c-axis (lengthwise). Mineralogically speaking, grape agate is not an agate, since it lacks banding. While commonly referred to as chalcedony, macroscopic drusy crystals on its surfaces and a coarse texture indicate a macrocrystalline structure instead of the microcrystalline or cryptocrystalline structure of chalcedony.

Grape agate may be considered a form of amethyst when purple in color. The purple crystals were determined by X-ray spectroscopy to contain trace amounts of iron (about 150 ppm), in addition to smaller traces of zinc and gallium. Like other amethyst, this color is due to radiation from decaying uranium in the surrounding rock activating color centers around the iron impurities. Purple grape agate can also fade in prolonged exposure to direct sunlight. The blue-green crystals, which are likely colored by inclusions of clay minerals, were determined to contain very high levels of magnesium (almost 1%) and calcium (0.2%) as well as traces of iron (1000 ppm) and minor traces of several other metals.

== Uses and treatments ==
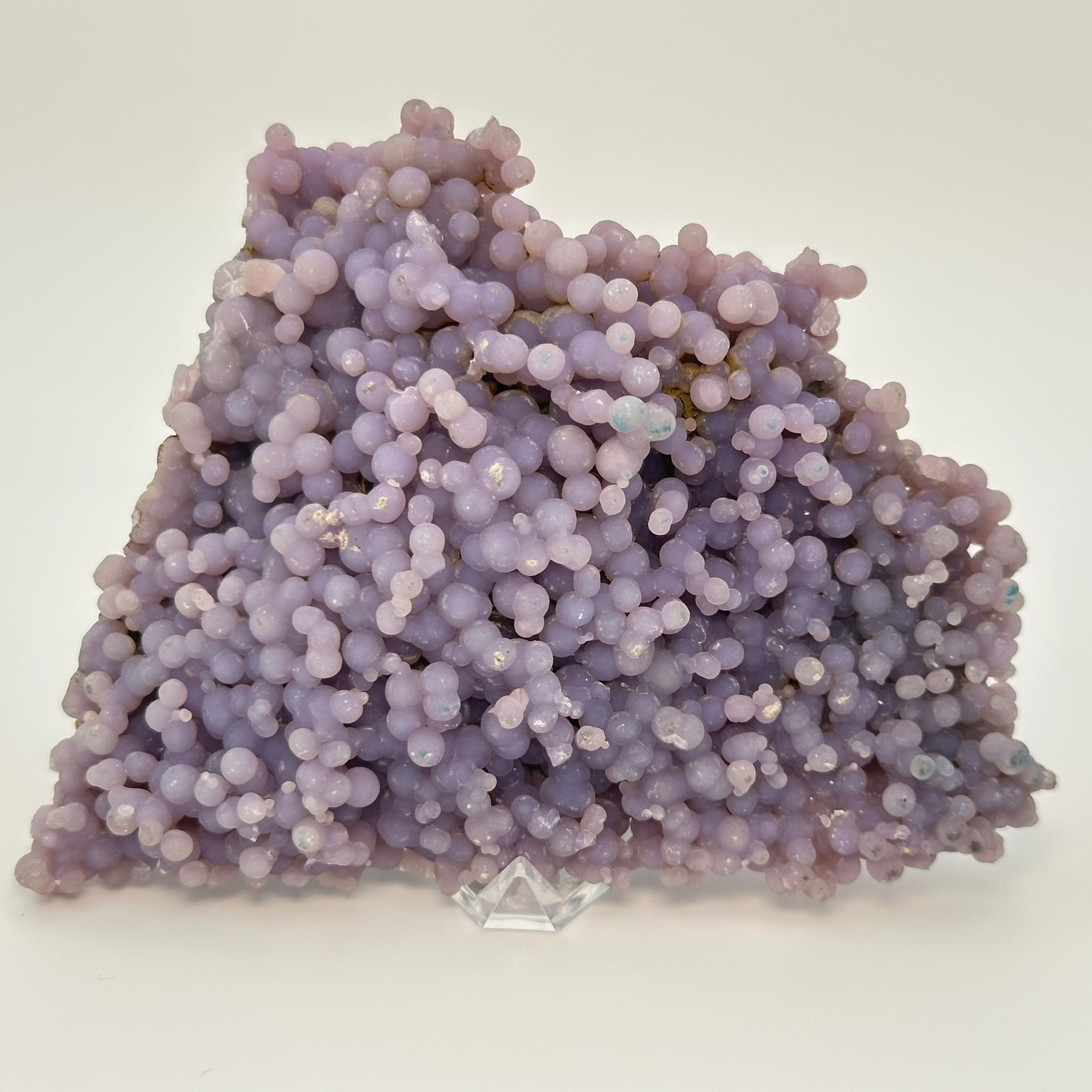
Roughly 4 inches (10 cm) long cluster of grape agate sold as a specimen

Colorful pieces of grape agate are sought after by mineral collectors and used by lapidary artists as a gemstone. Roughly 40% of the material with desirable colors is suitable for lapidary purposes; the rest is sold as specimens. Duller individual spheres can be tumble-polished, and some dull-colored grape agate may be dyed purple to fetch a higher price. Single spheres may be drilled and used as beads, while small clusters may be wire-wrapped or cut into cabochons for use in jewelry.
