= Smoky quartz =

Brown to black variety of quartz

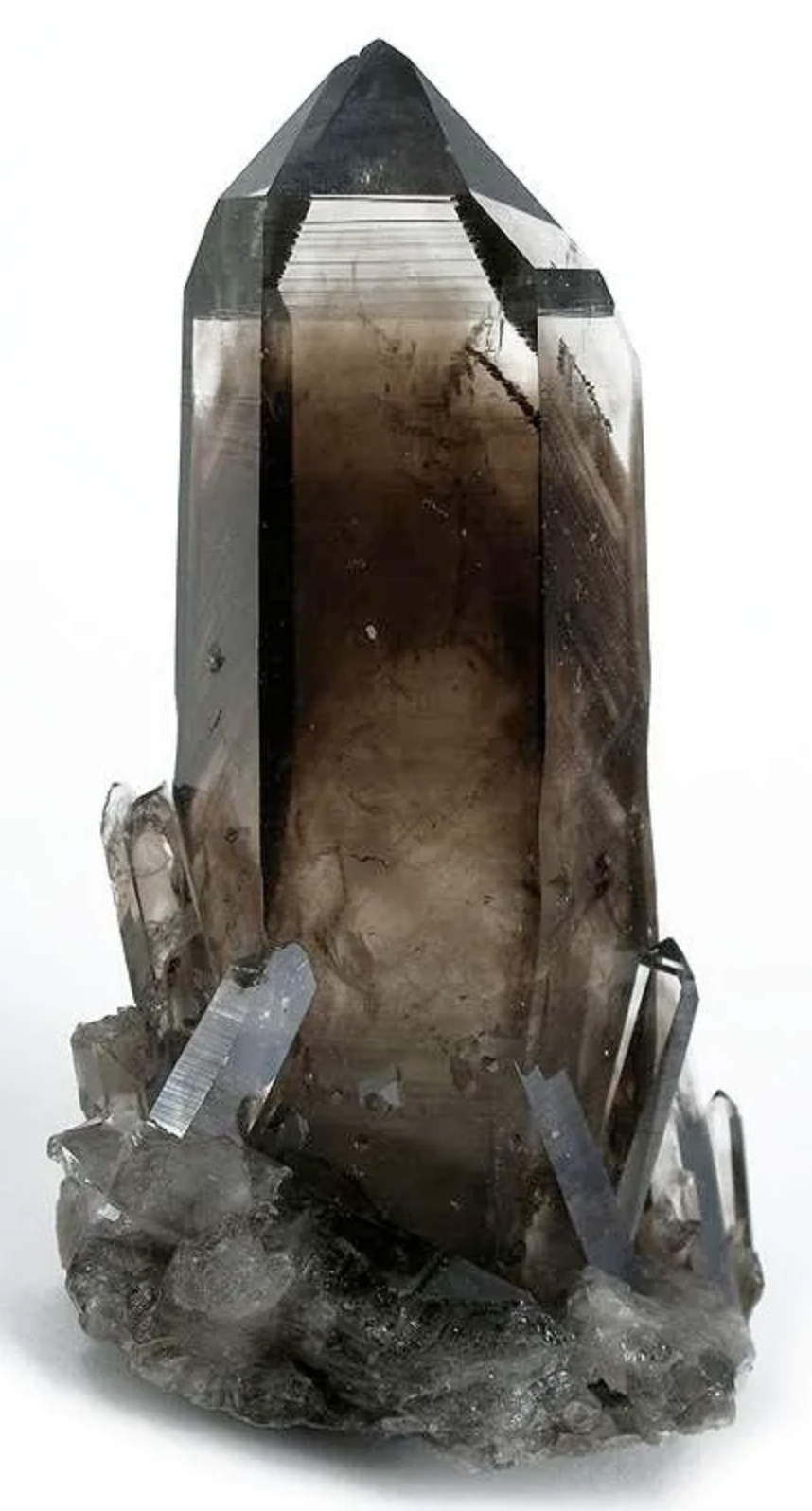

General
- Category: Tectosilicate minerals
- Group: Quartz group
- Formula: SiO_{2}
- IMA status: Variety of quartz
- Strunz classification: 04.DA.05
- Dana classification: 75.01.03.01
- Crystal system: α-quartz: trigonal trapezohedral class 3 2 β-quartz: hexagonal 622
- Space group: Trigonal 32
- Unit cell: a = 4.9133 Å, c = 5.4053 Å; Z=3

Identification
- Colour: Brown, gray, black
- Crystal habit: 6-sided prism ending in 6-sided pyramid (typical), drusy, fine-grained to microcrystalline, massive
- Twinning: Common Dauphine law, Brazil law and Japan law
- Cleavage: {0110} none
- Fracture: Conchoidal
- Tenacity: Brittle
- Mohs scale hardness: 7 – lower in impure varieties (defining mineral)
- Luster: Vitreous – waxy to dull when massive
- Streak: White
- Diaphaneity: Transparent to nearly opaque
- Specific gravity: 2.65; variable 2.59–2.63 in impure varieties
- Optical properties: Uniaxial (+)
- Refractive index: n_{ω} = 1.543–1.545 n_{ε} = 1.552–1.554
- Birefringence: +0.009 (B-G interval)
- Pleochroism: weak, from red-brown to yellow-brown
- Melting point: 1670 °C (β tridymite) 1713 °C (β cristobalite)
- Solubility: Insoluble at STP; 1 ppm_{mass} at 400 °C and 500 lb/in^{2} to 2600 ppm_{mass} at 500 °C and 1500 lb/in^{2}
- Other characteristics: lattice: hexagonal, Piezoelectric, may be triboluminescent, chiral (hence optically active if not racemic)

Smoky quartz is a brown to black, translucent variety of quartz. It ranges in clarity from almost complete transparency to almost-opaque black crystals. Smoky quartz is popular as a gemstone and as a collectible crystal.

== Properties ==
Smoky quartz ranges in color from brown or smoky gray to a nearly opaque black. The color of smoky quartz is produced when natural gamma radiation, emitted from the surrounding rock, activates color centers around aluminum impurities within the crystalline quartz. Smoky quartz is dichroic in polarized light and will fade in color if heated to above 200–300 °C (392–572 °F) or exposed to UV light. It may turn a pale yellow color resembling citrine; some heat-treated smoky quartz is sold commercially as citrine. Gamma irradiation can restore color to faded smoky quartz crystals. Smoky quartz crystals that grew in certain environments such as pegmatites and alpine fissures tend to be evenly colored, while crystals originating in other environments tend to exhibit color zoning or phantoms. In some crystals, the color may be darker near the edges.

Smoky quartz from urals

== Varieties ==
Morion is a very dark brown to black opaque variety of smoky quartz. Morion is also the German name for smoky quartz. The name is from a misreading of mormorion in Pliny the Elder.

Cairngorm quartz is a variety of smoky quartz found in the Cairngorm Mountains of Scotland. It usually has a smoky yellow-brown colour, though some specimens are greyish-brown. It is used in Scottish jewellery and as a decoration on kilt pins and the handles of sgianan-dubha (anglicised: sgian-dubhs or skean dhu).

== Uses ==
Smoky quartz is common and was not historically important, but in recent times it has become a popular gemstone, especially for jewelry.

Sunglasses, in the form of flat panes of smoky quartz, were used in China in the 12th century.

== See also ==
- List of minerals
- Amethyst
