= Pulpí Geode =

Large geological formation in Spain

Coordinates: 37.382°N 1.702°W

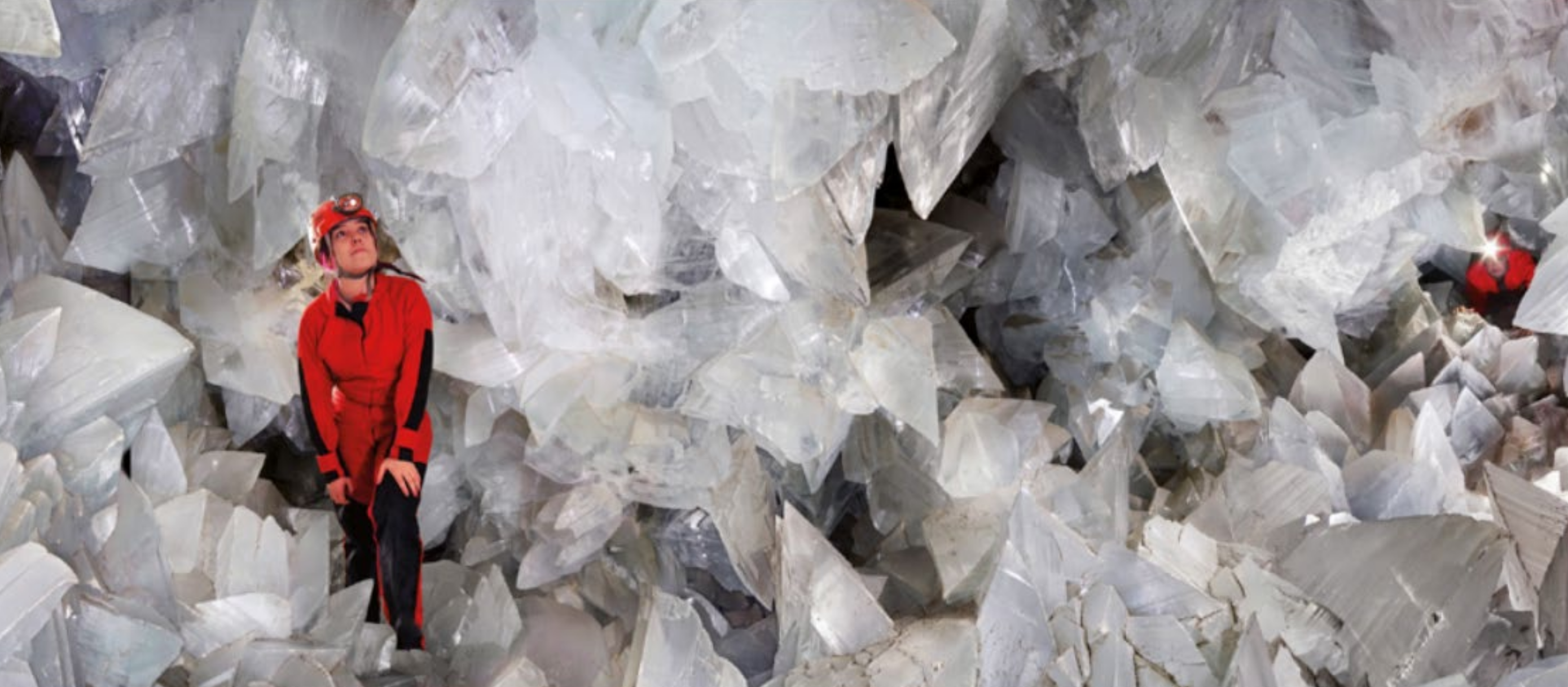
Cavers inside the geode

The Pulpí Geode (Spanish: Geoda de Pulpí) is a giant geode found in Spain near the town of Pulpí (Province of Almería) in December 1999, by Javier Garcia-Guinea of the Grupo Mineralogista de Madrid. This geode is one of the largest documented geodes in the world to date. It occupies a space of 10.7 cubic metres (380 cu ft), measuring 8 by 1.8 metres (26.2 by 5.9 ft) with an average height of 1.7 metres (5 ft 7 in), and is located at a depth of 50 metres (160 ft) in the Pilar de Jaravía mine, in the Sierra del Aguilón, in the municipality of Pulpí, 3 kilometres (1.9 mi) from the coast.

The geode has a funnel shape, with the narrowest part being L-shaped. It is notable on a worldwide scale for both its size and the transparency and perfection of the selenite (gypsum) crystals lining the interior, which reach up to 2 metres (6 ft 7 in) in length, with 50 centimetres (20 in) being the average. The abandoned silver-lead mine is now a geoheritage site attracting geotourists. The geode was damaged by vandals at the end of 2021, but the damage was not as severe as first thought.

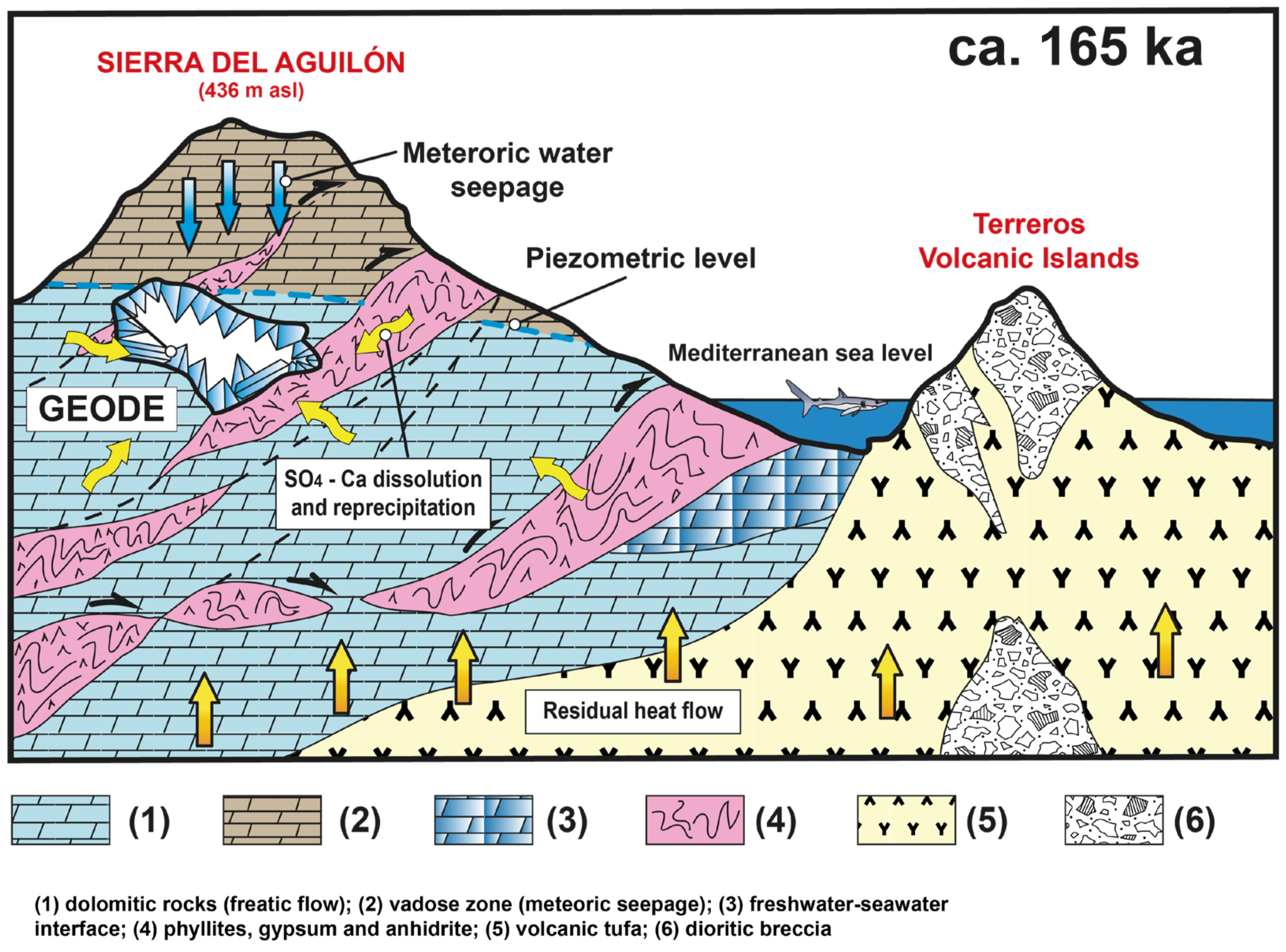
Schematic

The latest scientific research, on the origin of the geode, was published on 23 March 2022; the research was led by Fernando Gázquez of the University of Almeria, with the conclusion that the gypsum crystals were formed between 164 ± 15 thousand and 60 thousand years ago, in the upper Pleistocene, from a freshwater aquifer (with very little evidence of brackish or sea water, as suggested previously).
