= Geode =

Hollow formation inside a rock

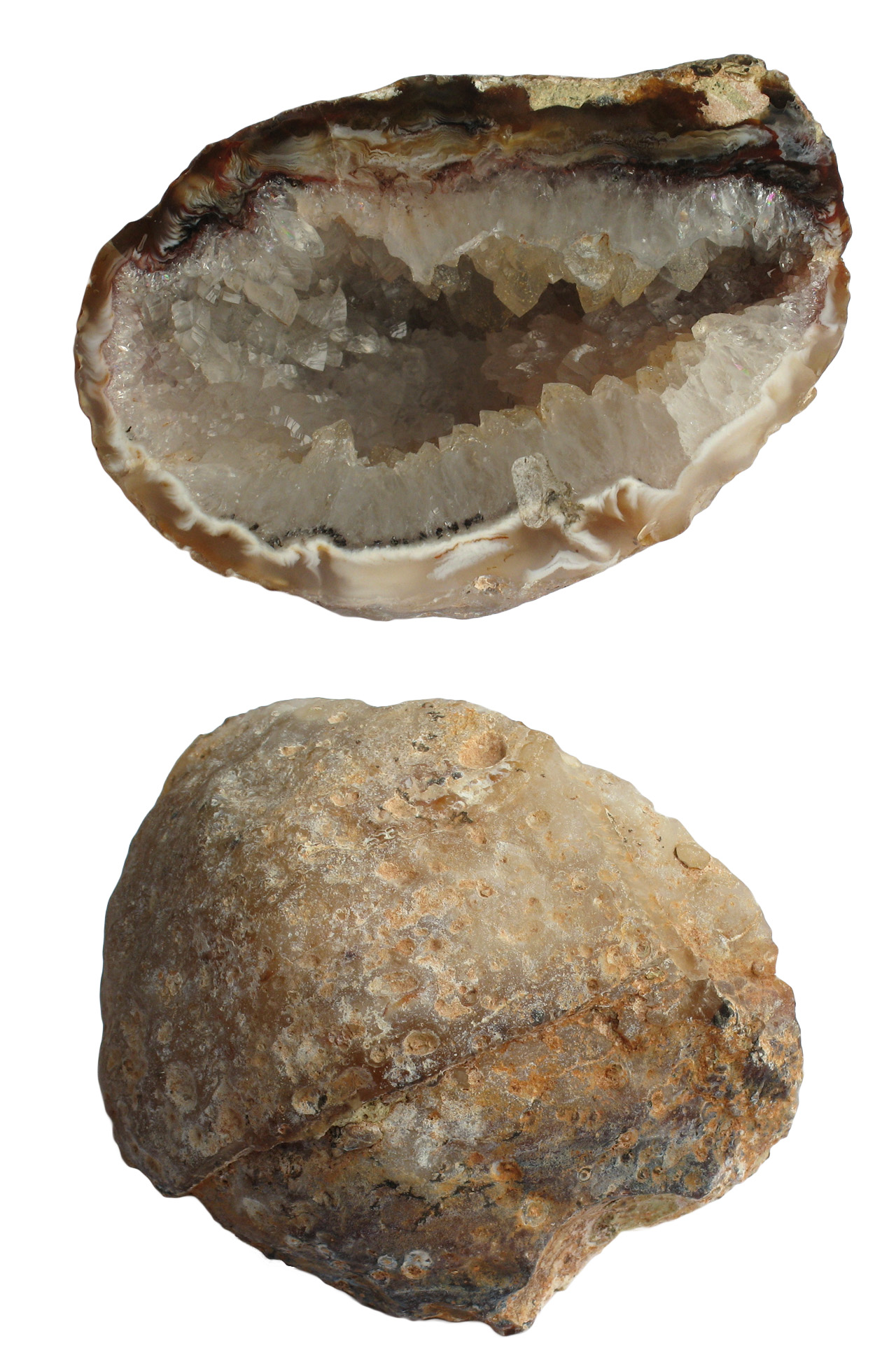
Quartz-filled geode, shown from inside (top) and outside (bottom)

A geode (/ˈdʒiː.oʊd/; from Ancient Greek γεώδης (geṓdēs) 'earthlike') is a geological secondary formation within sedimentary and volcanic rocks. Geodes are hollow, vaguely spherical rocks, in which masses of mineral matter (which may include crystals) are secluded.

The crystals are formed by the filling of vesicles in volcanic and subvolcanic rocks by minerals deposited from hydrothermal fluids; or by the dissolution of syngenetic concretions and partial filling by the same or other minerals precipitated from water, groundwater, or hydrothermal fluids.

== Formation ==
Geodes can form in any cavity, but the term is usually reserved for more or less rounded formations in igneous and sedimentary rocks. They can form in gas bubbles in igneous rocks, such as vesicles in basaltic lava; or, as in the American Midwest, in rounded cavities in sedimentary formations. After rock around the cavity hardens, dissolved silicates and/or carbonates are deposited on the inside surface. Over time, this slow feed of mineral constituents from groundwater or hydrothermal solutions allows crystals to form inside the hollow chamber. Bedrock containing geodes eventually weathers and decomposes, leaving them present at the surface if they are composed of resistant material such as quartz.

== Coloration ==
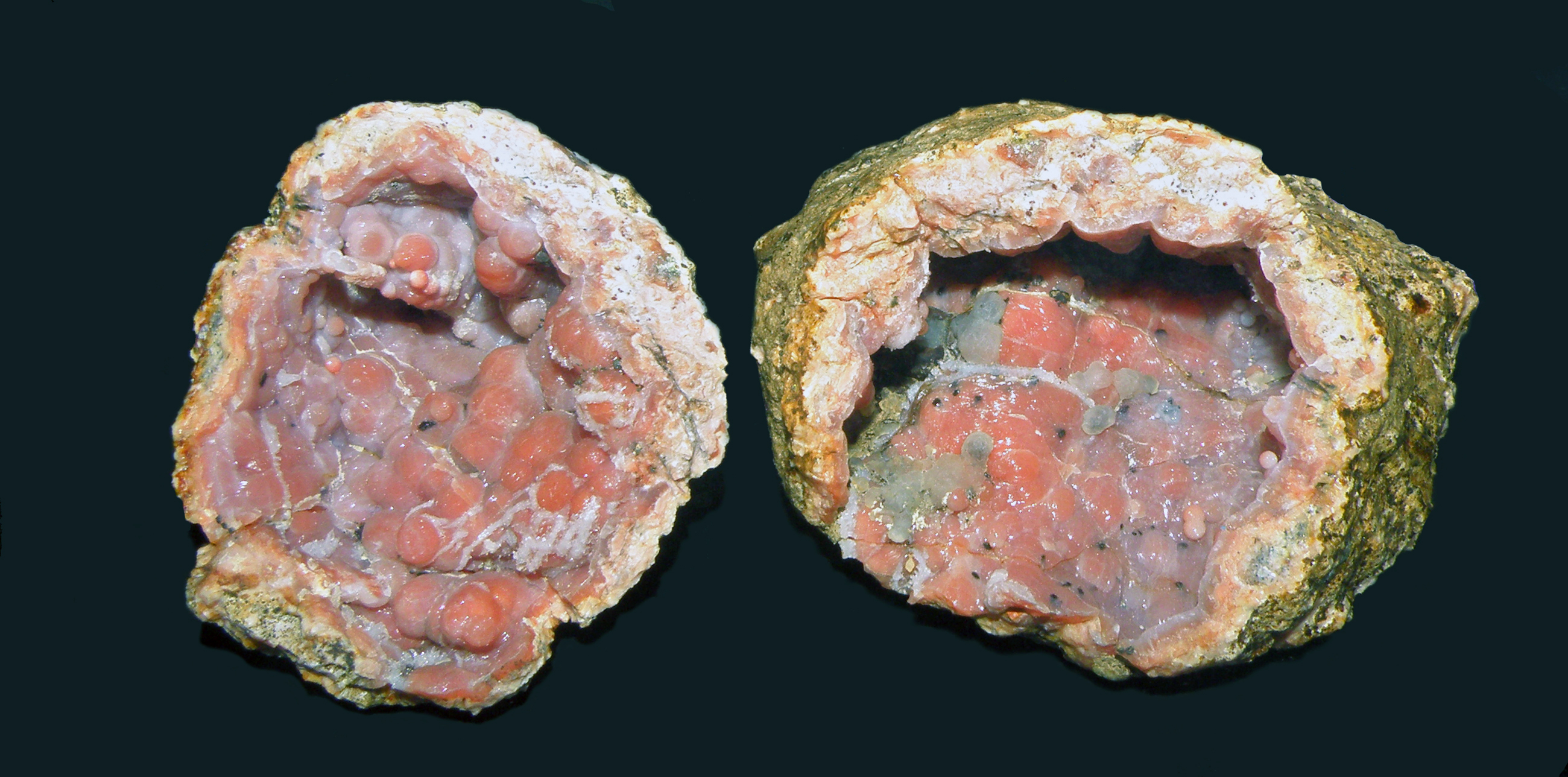
Reddish chalcedony geodes

The colours found inside geodes result from the minerals and trace elements present when the crystals formed. As mineral-rich water slowly deposits crystals within a cavity, different elements produce different hues: iron oxide and cobalt can yield reds, yellows or purples; titanium can create blues; chromium and nickel may produce greens; and manganese can give pink tones.

Many geodes contain banded agate or chalcedony, where changes in the chemistry of the solution over time produce the distinctive layers of colour. The type of mineral also affects colour: for example, quartz may appear colourless, white, or purple (as amethyst), while calcite, celestite or other minerals can produce earthy, pastel, or blue tones.

Some geodes on the market are artificially dyed, often in bright, unnatural colours such as electric blues or pinks, which would not form naturally. Generally, the intensity and pattern of colour in a geode reflect the chemical composition of the original solution and the conditions of crystal formation.

== Occurrence ==
Geodes are found where the geology is suitable with many of the commercially available ones coming from Brazil, Uruguay, Namibia, and Mexico. Large, amethyst-lined geodes are a feature of the basalts of the Paraná and Etendeka traps found in Brazil and Uruguay. Geodes are common in some formations in the United States (mainly in Indiana, Iowa, Missouri, western Illinois, Kentucky, and Utah).

Geodes are also abundant in the Mendip Hills in Somerset, England, where they are known locally as "potato stones". The term geode generally describes hollow formations. If the rock is completely solid inside, this would be classified as a nodule or thunderegg.

== Crystal caves ==
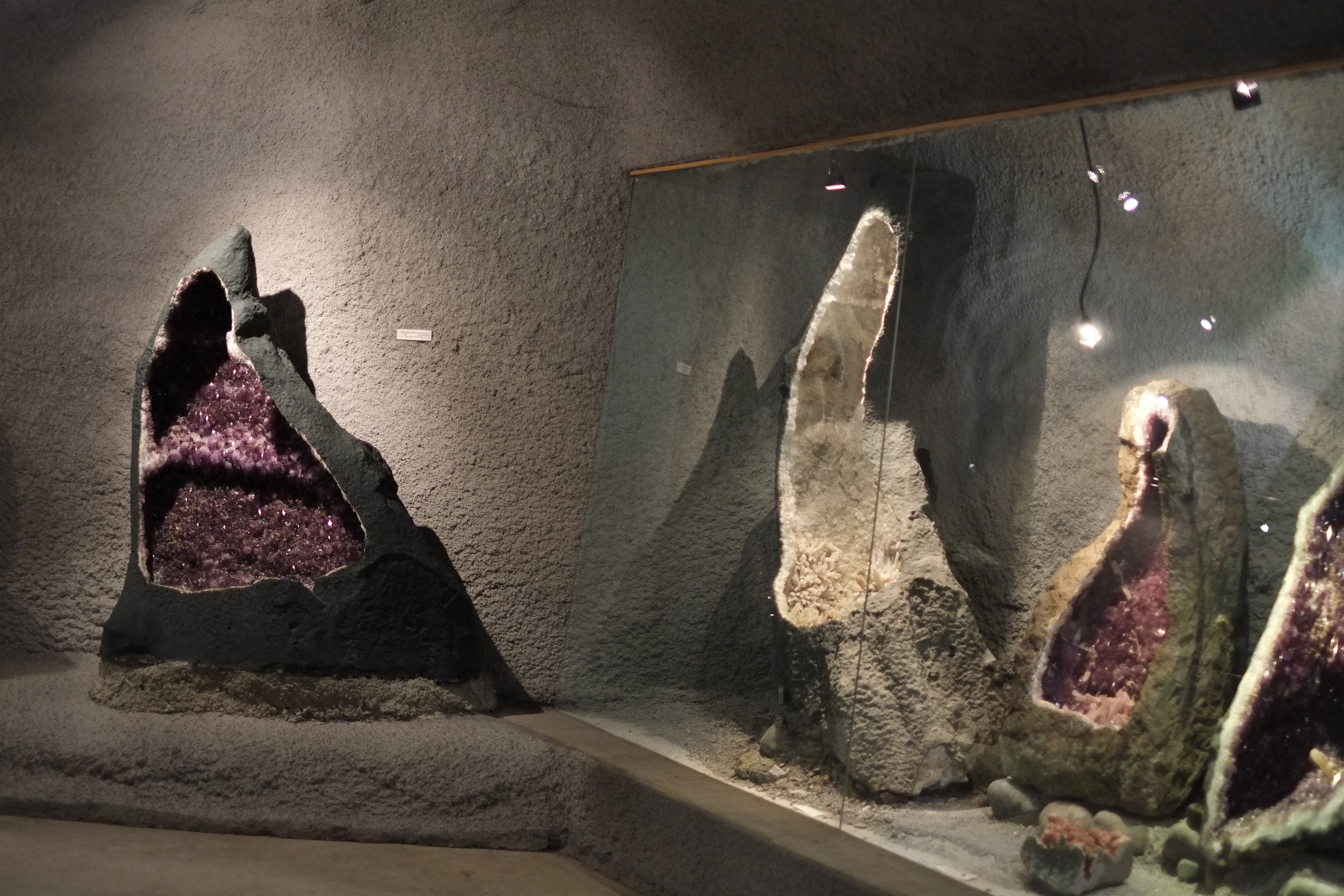
Very large amethyst and regular quartz geodes

'Crystal cave' is both an informal term for any large crystal-lined geode and also used for specific geoheritage locations such as the Crystal Cave (Ohio), discovered in 1887 at the Heineman Winery on Put-In-Bay, Ohio, the Cave of the Crystals (Mexico), and the Pulpi Geode, discovered in 1999 in Spain.

In 1999, a mineralogist group discovered a cave filled with giant selenite (gypsum) crystals in an abandoned silver mine, Mina Rica, near Pulpi, Province of Almeria, Spain. The cavity, which measured 8.0 by 1.8 by 1.7 metres (26.2 ft × 5.9 ft × 5.6 ft), was, at the time, the largest crystal cave ever found. Following its discovery, the entrance to the cave was blocked by five tons of rock, with an additional police presence to prevent looters. In the summer of 2019 the cave, a significant geotourism resource and now named the 'Geoda de Pulpi', Pulpi Geode, was opened as a tourist attraction, allowing small groups to visit the caves with a tour guide.

== See also ==
- Bristol Diamonds
- Coso artifact
- Lithophysa
- Septarian nodule
- Thunderegg
