= Amethyst =

Mineral, quartz variety

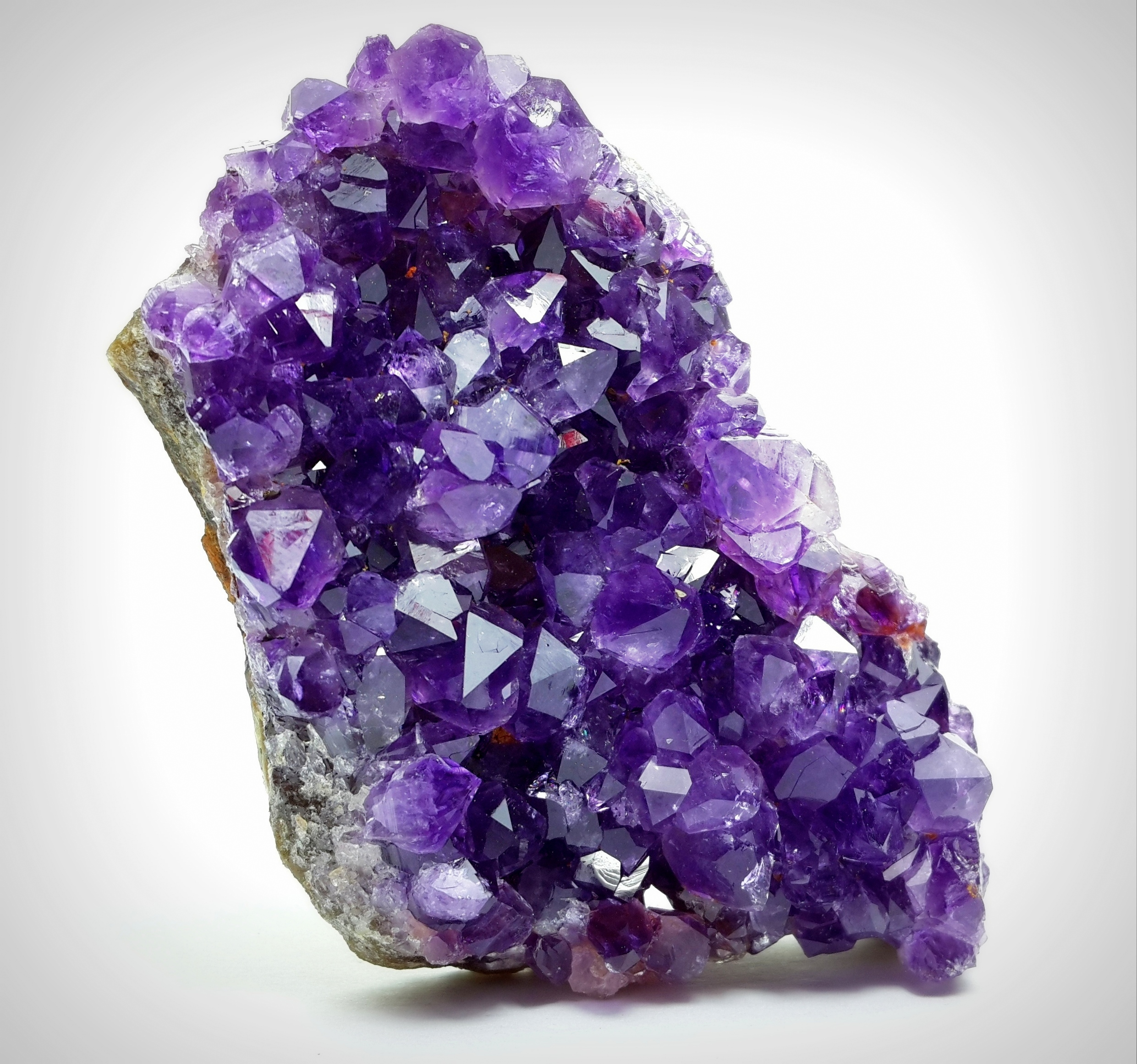
- Amethyst cluster from Artigas, Uruguay

General
- Category: Tectosilicate minerals
- Group: Quartz group
- Formula: Silica (silicon dioxide, SiO_{2})
- IMA status: Variety of quartz
- Crystal system: Trigonal
- Crystal class: Trapezohedral (32)
- Space group: P3_{2}21 (no. 154)

Identification
- Color: Purple, violet, dark purple
- Crystal habit: 6-sided prism ending in 6-sided pyramid (typical)
- Twinning: Dauphine law, Brazil law, and Japan law
- Cleavage: None
- Fracture: Conchoidal
- Mohs scale hardness: 7 (lower in impure varieties)
- Luster: Vitreous/glassy
- Streak: White
- Diaphaneity: Transparent to translucent
- Specific gravity: 2.65 constant; variable in impure varieties
- Optical properties: Uniaxial (+)
- Refractive index: n_{ω} = 1.543–1.553 n_{ε} = 1.552–1.554
- Birefringence: +0.009 (B-G interval)
- Pleochroism: Weak to moderate purple/reddish purple
- Melting point: 1650±75 °C
- Solubility: Insoluble in common solvents
- Common impurities: Iron
- Other characteristics: Piezoelectric

Amethyst is a violet variety of natural quartz. Ancient Greeks wore amethyst and carved drinking vessels from it in the belief that it would prevent intoxication. Amethyst, a semiprecious stone, is often used in jewelry. It occurs mostly in association with calcite, quartz, smoky quartz, hematite, pyrite, fluorite, goethite, agate, and chalcedony.

== Etymology ==
The name comes from the Koine Greek αμέθυστος amethystos from α- a-, "not" and μεθύσκω (Ancient Greek) methysko / μεθώ metho (Modern Greek), "intoxicate", a reference to the belief that the stone protected its owner from drunkenness.

== Structure ==
Amethyst is a violet variety of quartz (SiO_{2}) and owes its violet color to irradiation, impurities of iron (Fe^{3+}) and in some cases other transition metals, and the presence of other trace elements, which result in complex crystal lattice substitutions. The irradiation causes the iron (Fe^{+}_{3}) ions that replace Si in the lattice to lose an electron and form a [FeO_{4}]^{0} color center. Amethyst is a three-dimensional network of tetrahedra where the silicon atoms are in the center and are surrounded by four oxygen atoms located at the vertices of a tetrahedron. This structure is quite rigid and results in quartz's hardness and resistance to weathering. The hardness of the mineral is the same as quartz, thus making it suitable for use in jewelry.

== Hue and tone ==
Amethyst occurs in primary hues from a light lavender or pale violet to a deep purple. Amethyst may exhibit one or both secondary hues, red and blue. High-quality amethyst can be found in Siberia, Sri Lanka, Brazil, Uruguay, and the Far East. The ideal grade, called "Deep Siberian", has a primary purple hue of around 75–80%, with 15–20% blue and (depending on the light source) red secondary hues. "Rose de France" is defined by its markedly light shade of the purple, reminiscent of a lavender / lilac shade. These pale colors were once considered undesirable, but have recently become popular due to intensive marketing.

Green quartz is sometimes called green amethyst; the scientific name is prasiolite. Other names for green quartz are vermarine and lime citrine.

Amethyst frequently shows color zoning, with the most intense color typically found at the crystal terminations. One of gem cutters' tasks is to make a finished product with even color. Sometimes, only a thin layer of a natural, uncut amethyst is violet colored, or the color is very uneven. The uncut gem may have only a small portion that is suitable for faceting.

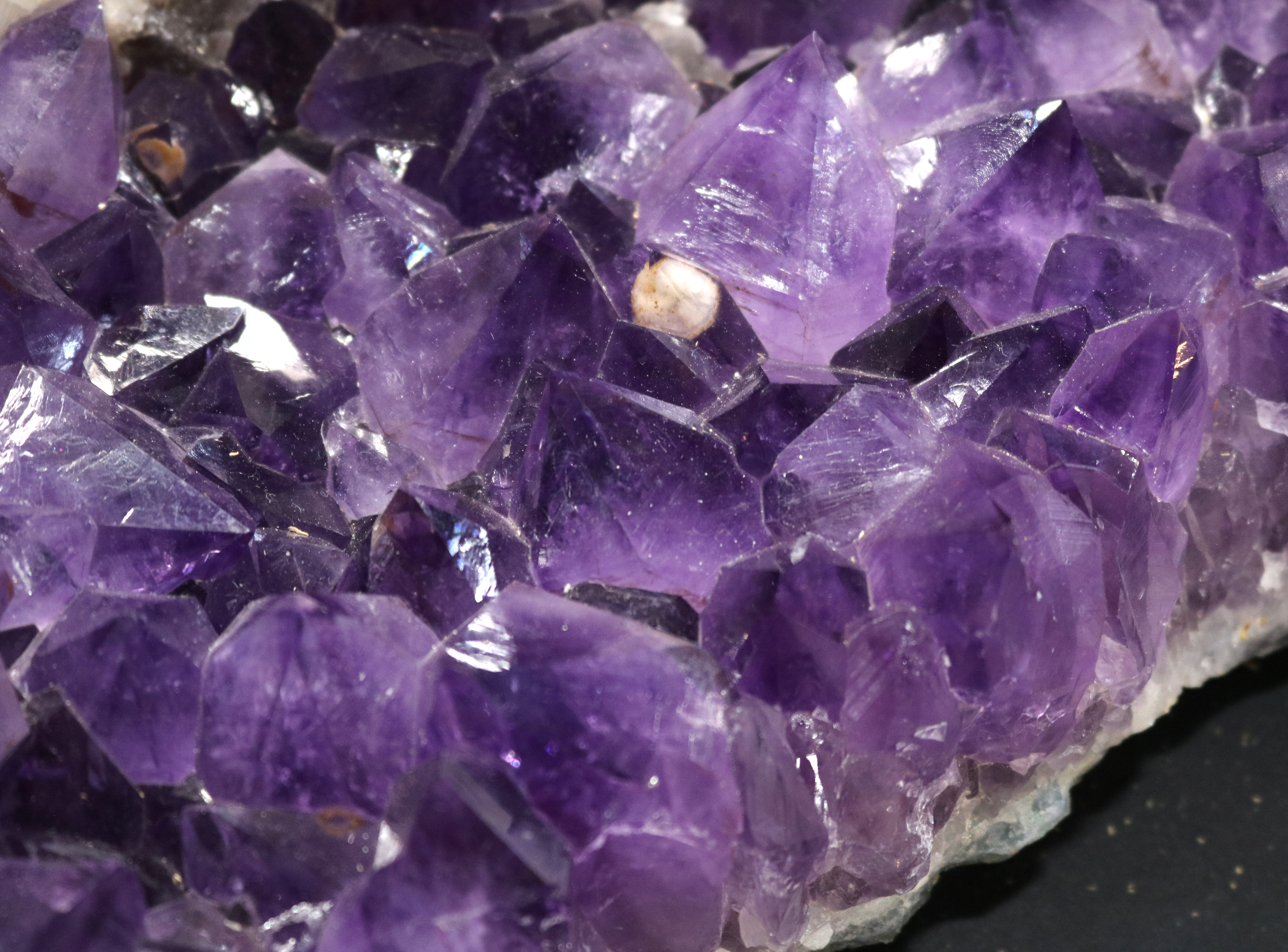
Natural purple/violet amethyst

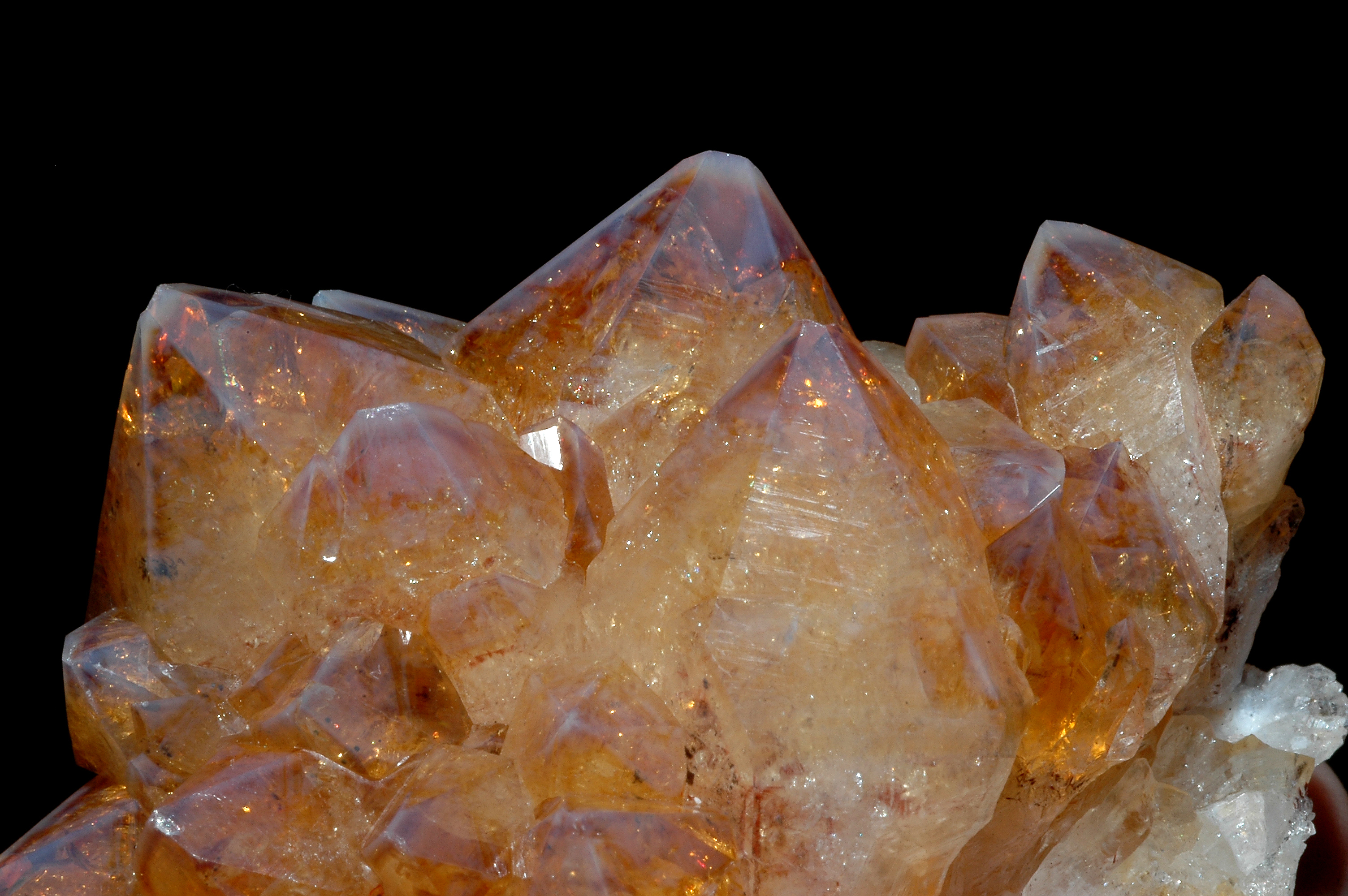
Heat-treated amethyst

The color of amethyst has been demonstrated to result from substitution by irradiation of trivalent iron (Fe^{3+}) for silicon in the structure, in the presence of trace elements of large ionic radius, and to a certain extent, the amethyst color can naturally result from displacement of transition elements even if the iron concentration is low. Natural amethyst is dichroic in reddish violet and bluish violet, but when heated, turns yellow-orange, yellow-brown, or dark brownish and may resemble citrine, but loses its dichroism, unlike genuine citrine. When partially heated, amethyst can result in ametrine.

Amethyst can fade in tone if overexposed to light sources, and can be artificially darkened with adequate irradiation. It does not fluoresce under either short-wave or long-wave UV light.

== Geographic distribution ==
Amethyst is found in many locations around the world. Between 2000 and 2010, the greatest production was from Marabá and Pau d'Arco, Pará, and the Paraná Basin, Rio Grande do Sul, Brazil; Sandoval, Santa Cruz, Bolivia; Artigas, Uruguay; Kalomo, Zambia; and Thunder Bay, Ontario. Lesser amounts are found in many other locations in Indonesia, Africa, Brazil, Spain, Argentina, Russia, Afghanistan, South Korea, Mexico, and the United States.

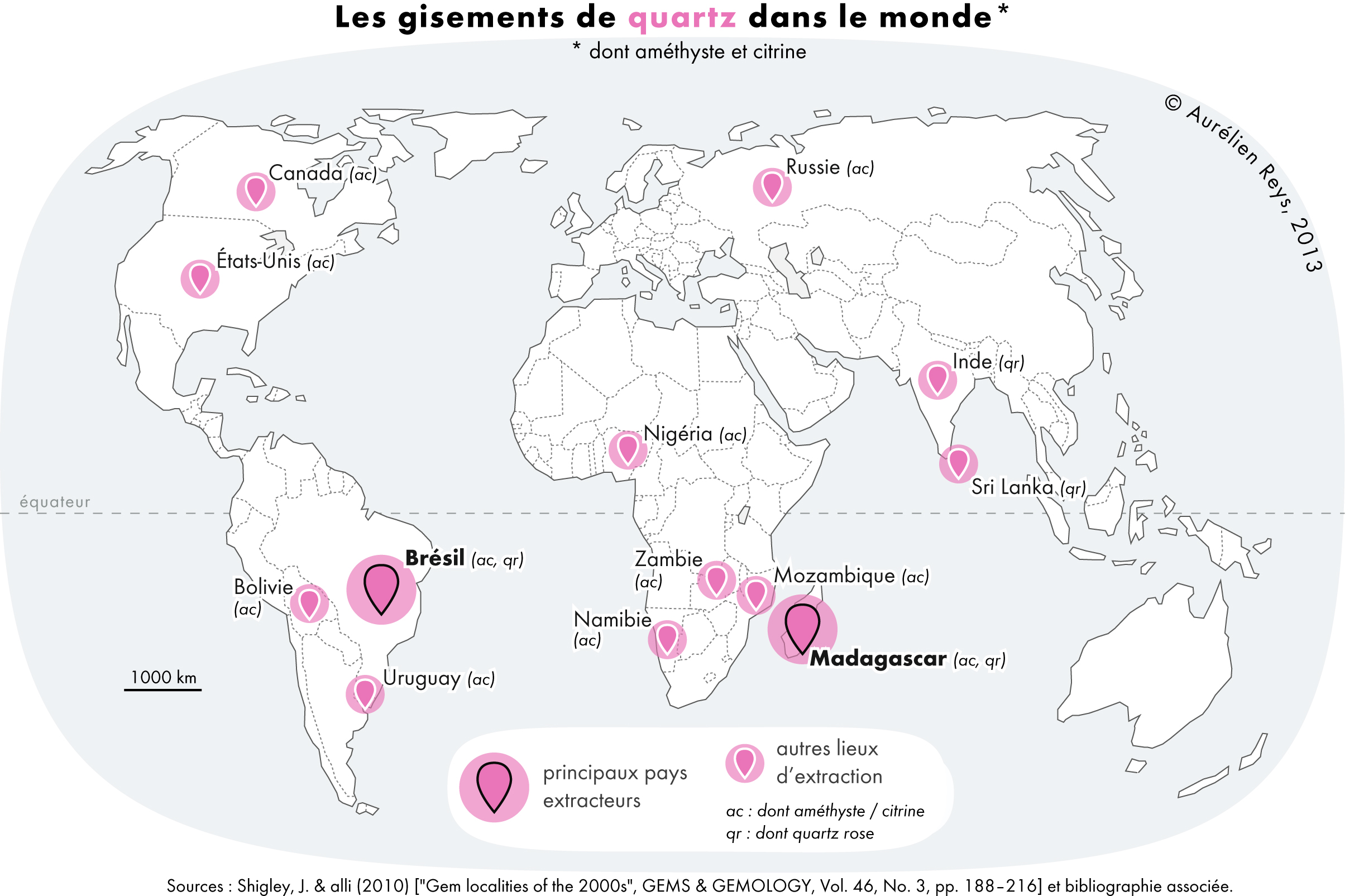
Main amethyst-producing countries

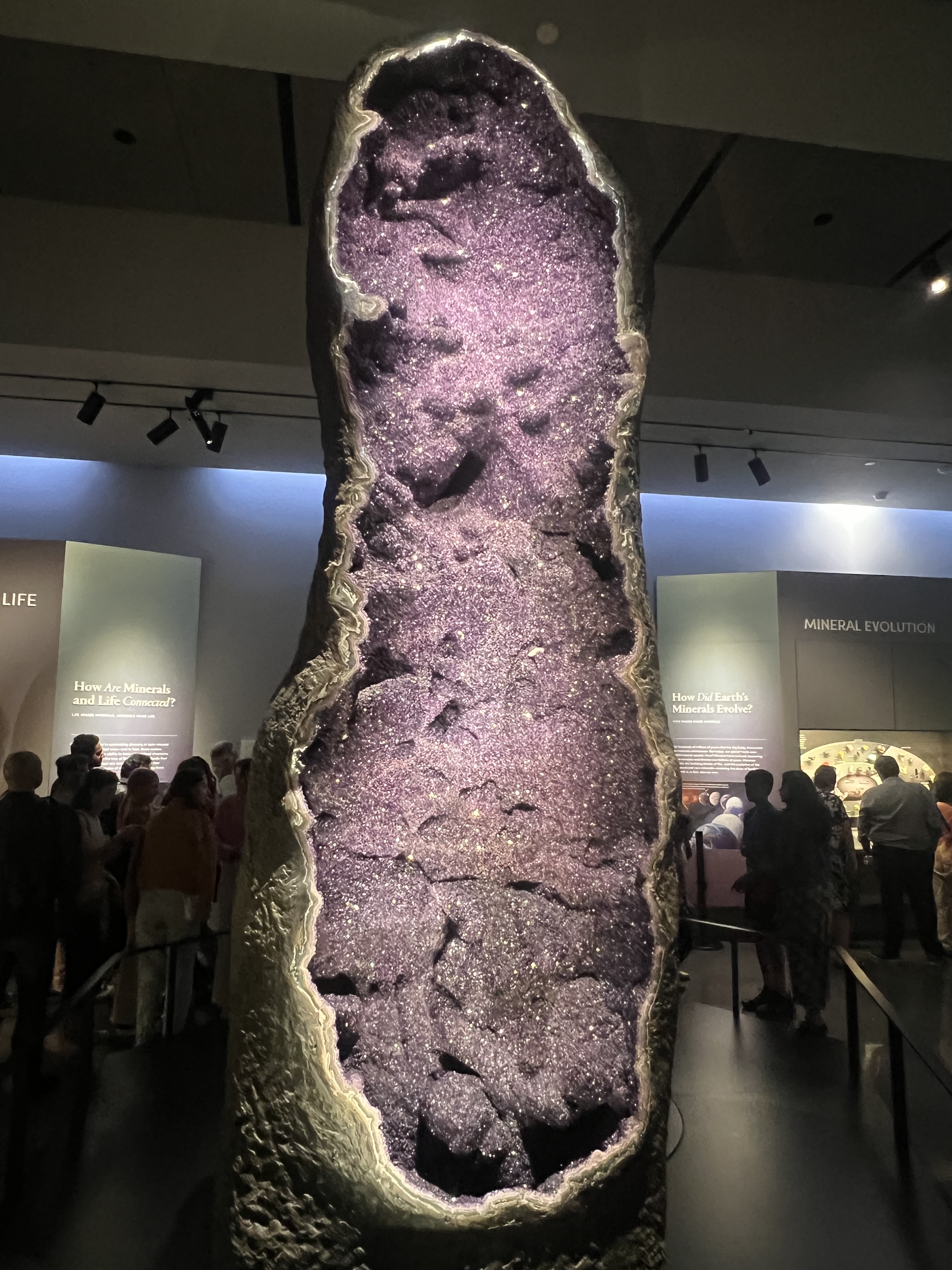
A 3.7 meters tall, 4 ton amethyst geode on display at the American Museum of Natural History collected from Artigas, Uruguay.

Amethyst is produced in abundance in the state of Rio Grande do Sul in Brazil where it occurs in large geodes within volcanic rocks. Many of the hollow agates of southwestern Brazil and Uruguay contain a crop of amethyst crystals in the interior. Artigas, Uruguay and neighboring Brazilian state Rio Grande do Sul are large world producers, with lesser quantities mined in Minas Gerais and Bahia states.

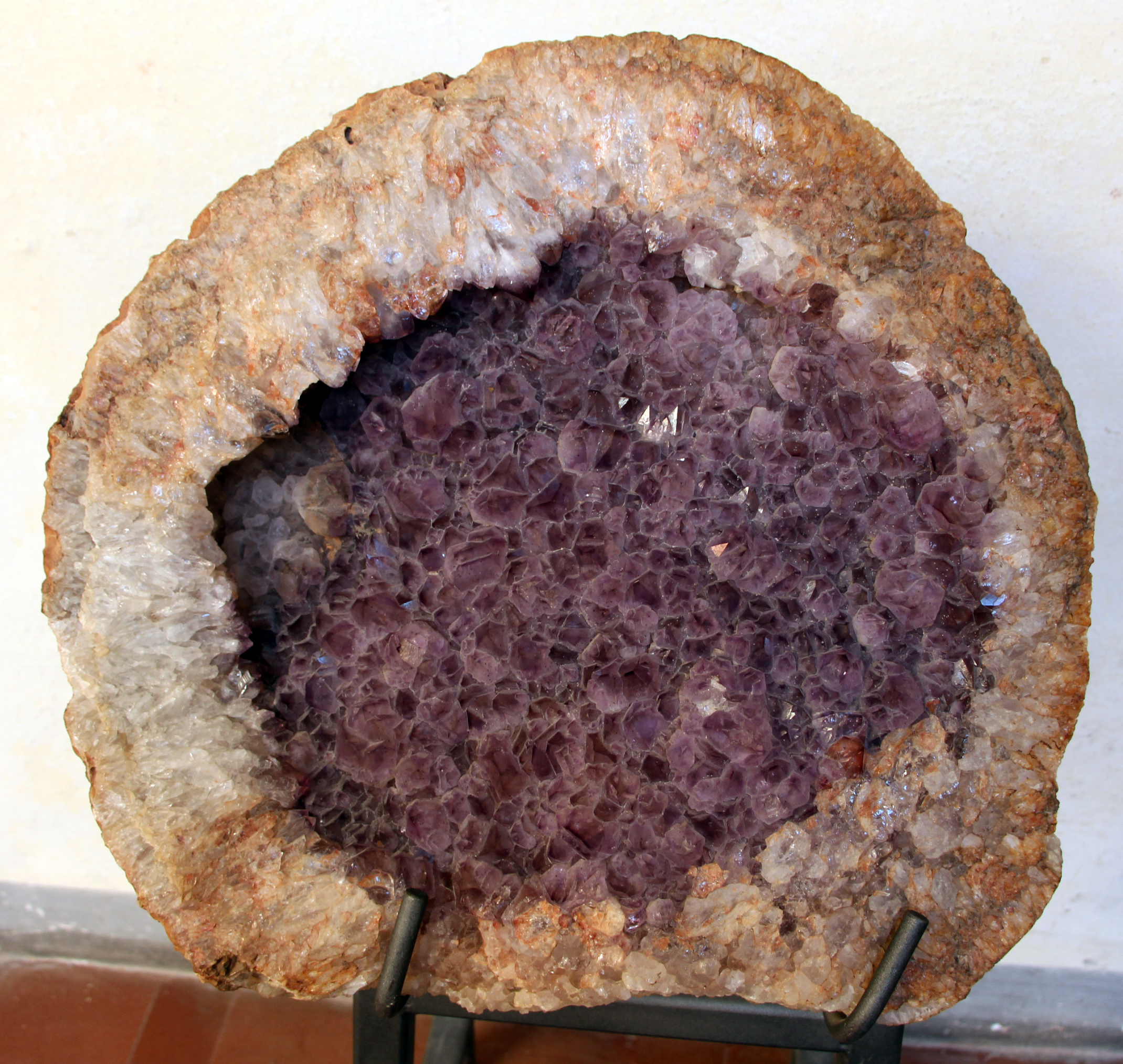
An amethyst geode that formed when large crystals grew in open spaces inside the rock

Amethyst is also found and mined in South Korea. The large opencast amethyst vein at Maissau, Lower Austria, was historically important, but is no longer included among significant producers. Much fine amethyst comes from Russia, especially near Mursinka in the Sverdlovsk oblast, where it occurs in drusy cavities in granitic rocks. Amethyst was historically mined in many localities in south India, though these are no longer significant producers. One of the largest global amethyst producers is Zambia in southern Africa, with an annual production around 1000 tons.

Amethyst occurs at many localities in the United States. The most important production is at Four Peaks, Gila and Maricopa Counties, Arizona, and Jackson's Crossroads, Wilkes County, Georgia.

Smaller occurrences have been reported in the Red Feather Lakes, near Fort Collins, Colorado; Amethyst Mountain, Texas; Yellowstone National Park; Delaware County, Pennsylvania; Haywood County, North Carolina; Deer Hill and Stow, Maine, and in the Lake Superior region of Minnesota, Wisconsin, and Michigan.

Amethyst is relatively common in the Canadian provinces of Ontario and Nova Scotia. The largest amethyst mine in North America is located in Thunder Bay, Ontario.

Amethyst is the official state gemstone of South Carolina. Several South Carolina amethysts are on display at the Smithsonian Museum of Natural History.

== History ==
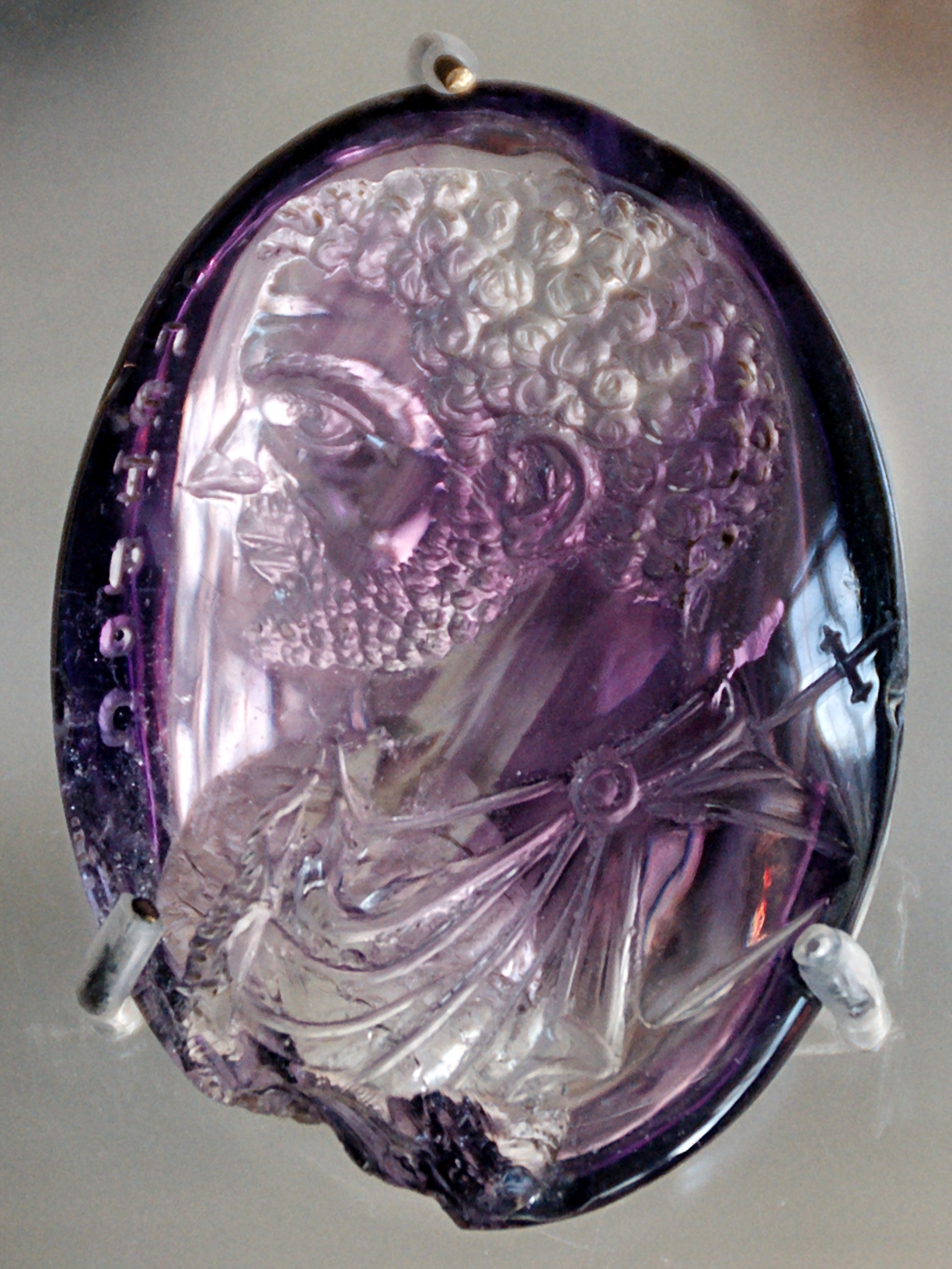
Roman intaglio engraved gem of Caracalla in amethyst, once in the Treasury of Sainte-Chapelle

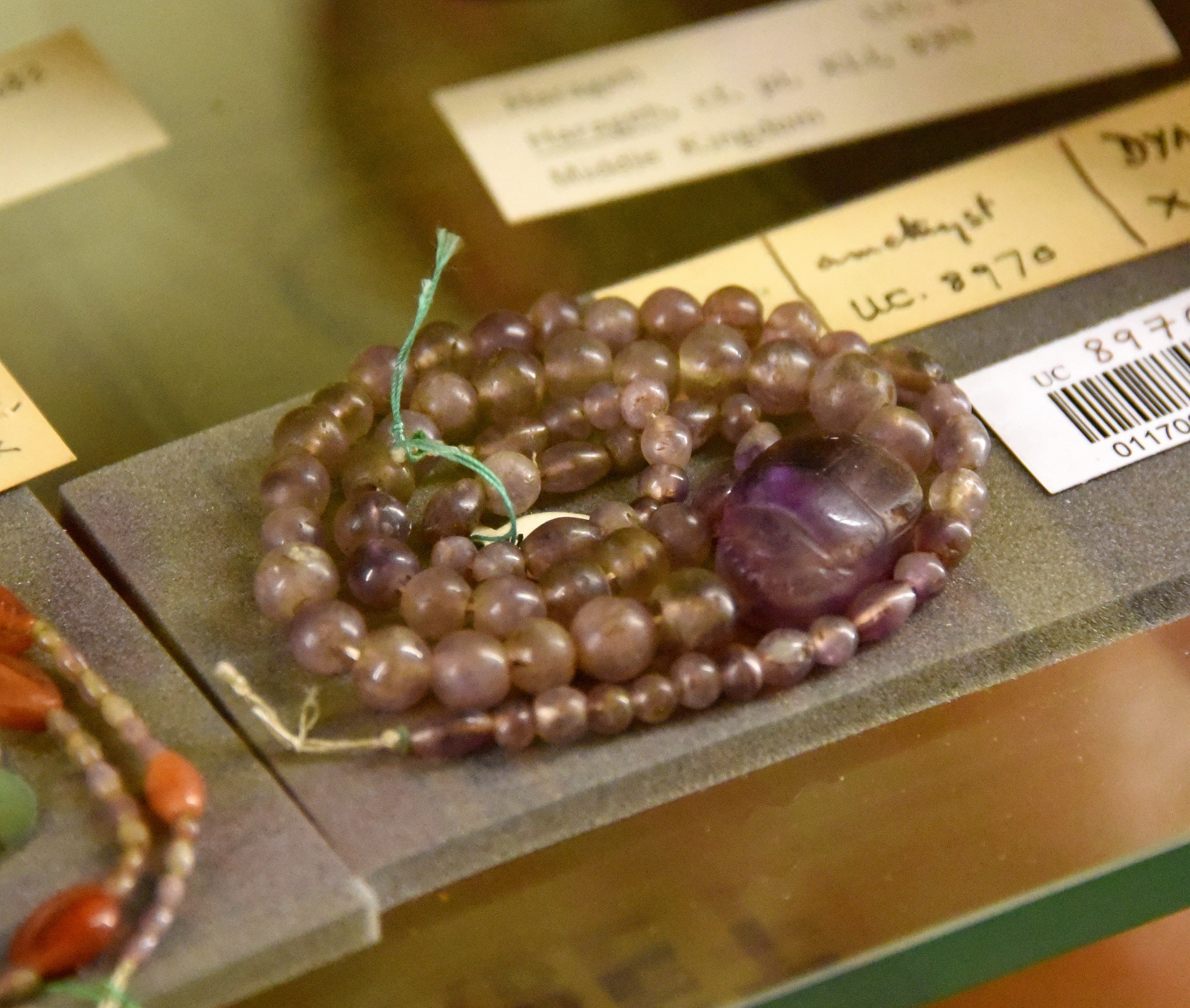
Uninscribed amethyst scarab at the center of a string of amethyst ball beads from Egypt

Amethyst was used as a gemstone by the ancient Egyptians and was largely employed in antiquity for intaglio engraved gems.

The ancient Greeks believed amethyst gems could prevent intoxication, while medieval European soldiers wore amethyst amulets as protection in battle in the belief that amethysts heal people and keep them cool-headed. Beads of amethyst were found in Anglo-Saxon graves in England. Anglican bishops wear an episcopal ring often set with an amethyst, an allusion to the description of the Apostles as "not drunk" at Pentecost in Acts 2:15.

A large geode, or "amethyst-grotto", from near Santa Cruz in southern Brazil was presented at a 1902 exhibition in Düsseldorf, Germany.

== Synthetic amethyst ==
Synthetic (laboratory-grown) amethyst is produced by a synthesis method called hydrothermal growth, which grows the crystals inside a high-pressure autoclave.

Synthetic amethyst is made to imitate the best quality amethyst. Its chemical and physical properties are the same as those of natural amethyst, and it cannot be differentiated with absolute certainty without advanced gemmological testing (which is often cost-prohibitive). On the other hand, if some inexactness is acceptable, one test based on "Brazil law twinning" (a form of quartz twinning where right- and left-hand quartz structures are combined in a single crystal) can be used to identify most synthetic amethyst rather easily. Synthesizing twinned amethyst is possible, but this type is not available in large quantities in the market.

Treated amethyst is produced by gamma ray, X-ray, or electron-beam irradiation of clear quartz (rock crystal), which has been first doped with ferric impurities. Exposure to heat partially cancels the irradiation effects and amethyst generally becomes yellow or even green. Much of the citrine, cairngorm, or yellow quartz of jewelry is said to be merely "burnt amethyst".

== Cultural history ==
=== Ancient Greece ===
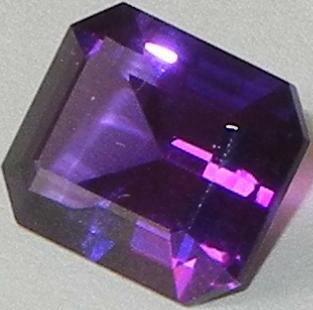
Emerald cut amethyst

The Greek word amethystos may be translated as "not drunken", from Greek a-, "not" + methustos, "intoxicated". Amethyst was considered to be a strong antidote against drunkenness. (Note: The earliest reference to amethyst as a symbol of sobriety is in a poem by Asclepiades of Samos (born c. 320 BCE). An epigram by Plato the Younger also mentions amethyst in connection with drinking: "The stone is an amethyst; but I, the tipler Dionysus, say, "Let it either persuade me to be sober, or let it learn to get drunk." Pliny says about amethysts: "The falsehoods of the magicians would persuade us that these stones are preventive of inebriety, and that it is from this that they have derived their name." which is why wine goblets were often carved from it.)

In his poem "L'Amethyste, ou les Amours de Bacchus et d'Amethyste" (Amethyst or the loves of Bacchus and Amethyste), the French poet Rémy Belleau (1528–1577) invented a myth in which Bacchus, the god of intoxication, of wine, and grapes was pursuing a maiden named Amethyste, who refused his affections. Amethyste prayed to the gods to remain chaste, a prayer which the chaste goddess Diana answered, transforming her into a white stone. Humbled by Amethyste's desire to remain chaste, Bacchus poured wine over the stone as an offering, dyeing the crystals purple. (Note: The "myth" of Amethyste and Bacchus was invented by the French poet Remy Belleau (1528–1577).)

Variations of the story include that Dionysus had been insulted by a mortal and swore to slay the next mortal who crossed his path, creating fierce tigers to carry out his wrath. The mortal turned out to be a beautiful young woman, Amethystos, who was on her way to pay tribute to Artemis. Her life was spared by Artemis, who transformed the maiden into a statue of pure crystalline quartz to protect her from the brutal claws. Dionysus wept tears of wine in remorse for his action at the sight of the beautiful statue. The god's tears then stained the quartz purple.

This myth and its variations are not found in classical sources. However, the goddess Rhea does present Dionysus with an amethyst stone to preserve the wine-drinker's sanity in historical text.

=== Other cultural associations ===
Tibetans consider amethyst sacred to the Buddha and make prayer beads from it. Amethyst is considered the birthstone of February. In the Middle Ages, it was considered a symbol of royalty and used to decorate English regalia. In the Old World, amethyst was considered one of the cardinal gems, in that it was one of the five gemstones considered precious above all others, until large deposits were found in Brazil.

== Value ==
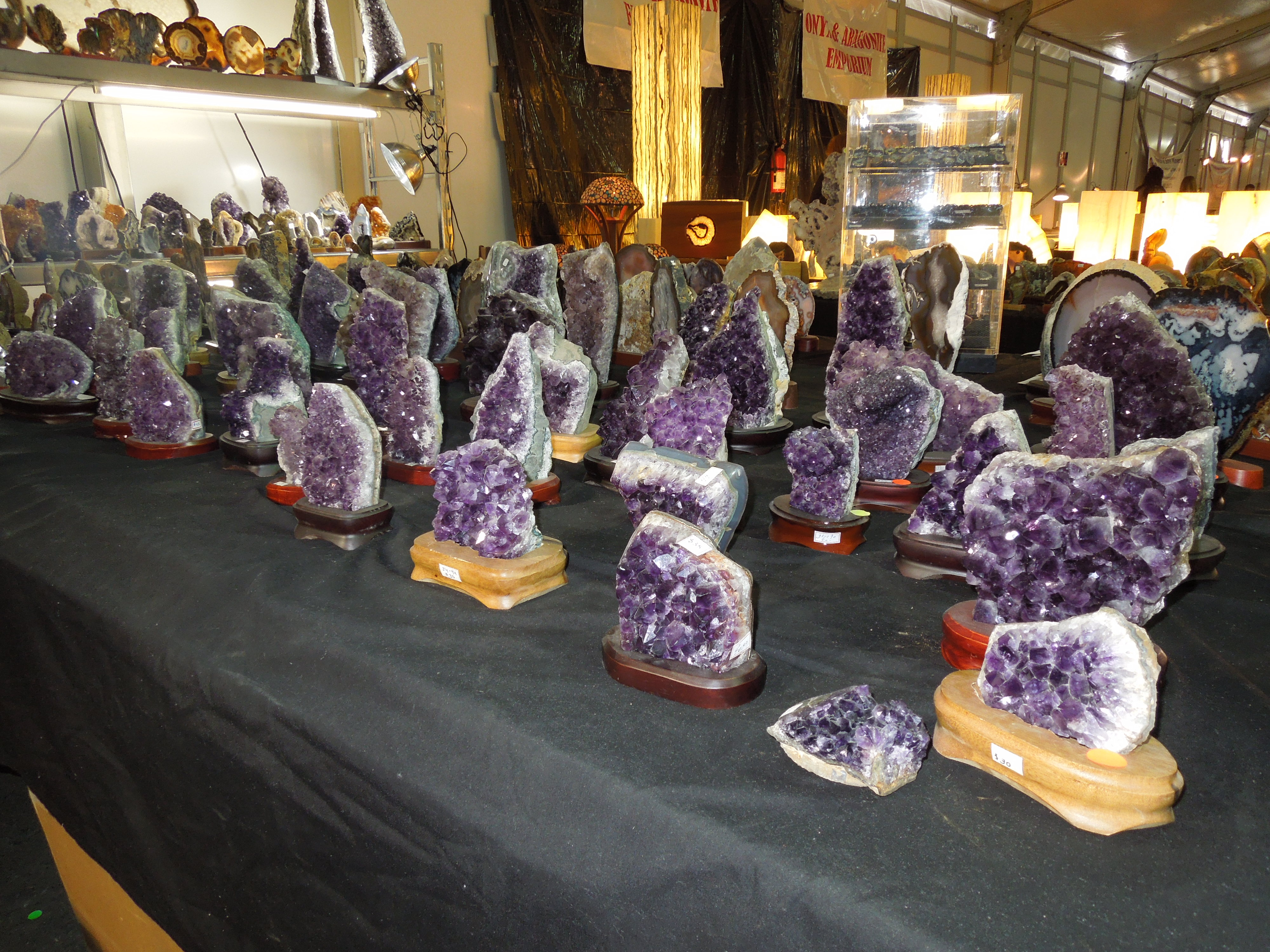
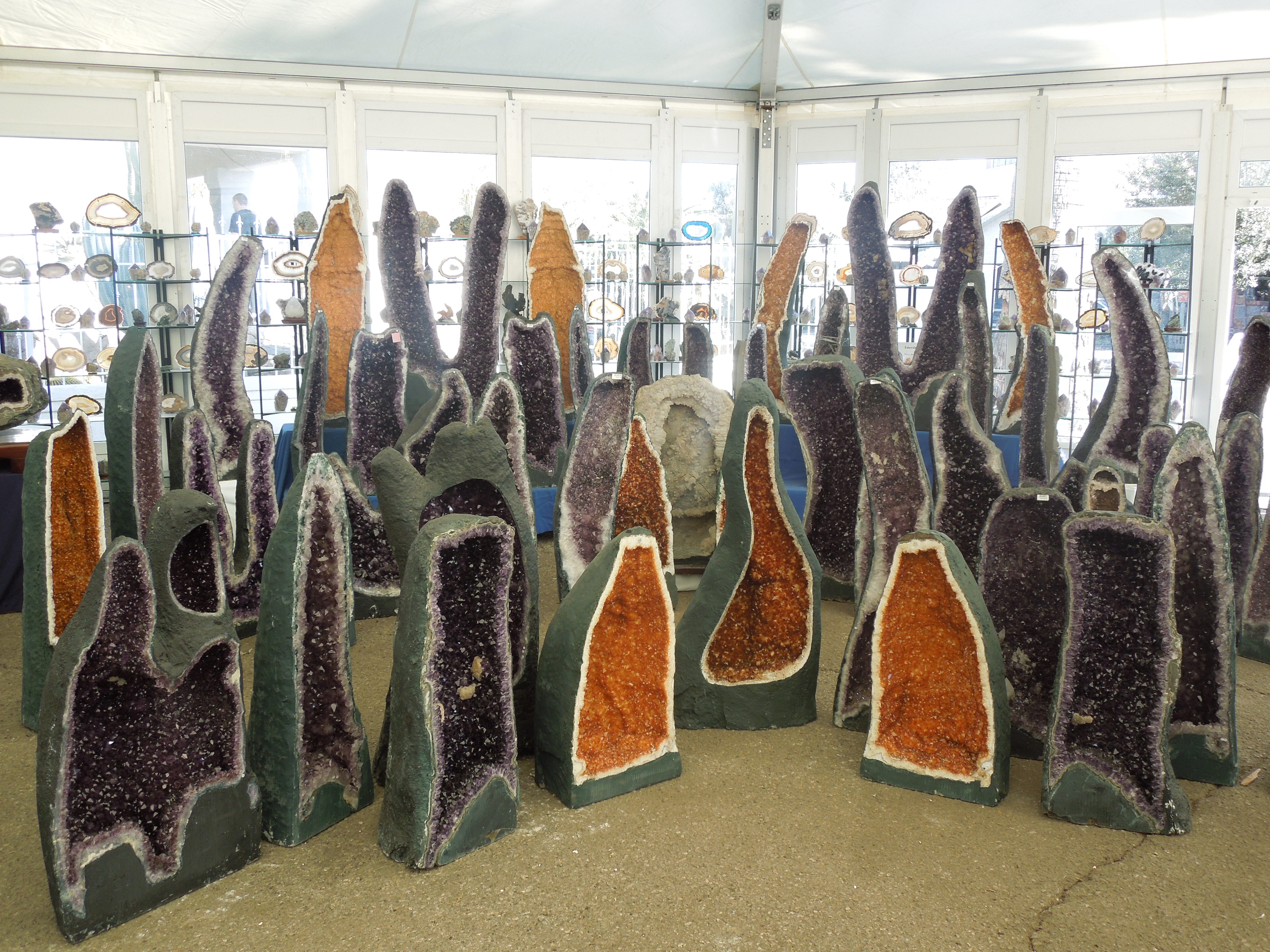
Amethyst geodes displayed at the 2012 Tucson Gem & Mineral Show

Until the 18th century, amethyst was included in the cardinal, or most valuable, gemstones (along with diamond, sapphire, ruby, and emerald), but since the discovery of extensive deposits in locations such as Brazil, it has lost most of its value. It is now considered a semiprecious stone.

Collectors look for depth of color, possibly with red flashes if cut conventionally. As amethyst is readily available in large structures, the value of the gem is not primarily defined by carat weight. This is different from most gemstones, since the carat weight typically exponentially increases the value of the stone. The biggest factor in the value of amethyst is the color displayed.

The highest-grade amethyst (called deep Russian) is exceptionally rare. When one is found, its value is dependent on the demand of collectors; however, the highest-grade sapphires or rubies are still orders of magnitude more expensive than amethyst.

== Handling and care ==
The most suitable setting for gem amethyst is a prong or a bezel setting. The channel method must be used with caution.

Amethyst has a Mohs hardness of 7, but it can still be damaged if handled carelessly. Amethyst is sensitive to strong heat and may lose or change its colour when exposed to prolonged heat or light. Polishing the stone or cleaning it by ultrasonic or steamer must be done with caution.

== See also ==
- Grape agate
- List of minerals
- Specimen Ridge
