= Pulpí =

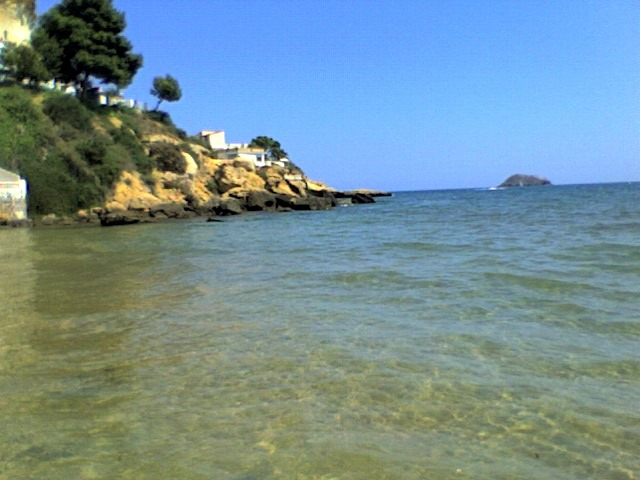

- Flag Coat of arms

- Location of Pulpí Pulpí (Andalusia) Pulpí (Spain)
- Coordinates: 37°24′07″N 1°45′03″W
- Country: Spain
- Community: Andalusia
- Province: Almería
- Comarca: Levante Almeriense

Government
  - Mayor: María Dolores Muñoz Pérez (PSOE)

Area
  - Total: 96 km^{2} (37 sq mi)
- Elevation: 197 m (646 ft)

Population (2025-01-01)
  - Total: 12,214
  - Density: 130/km^{2} (330/sq mi)
- Time zone: UTC+1 (CET)
  - Summer (DST): UTC+2 (CEST)

Pulpí is a municipality of Almería province, in the autonomous community of Andalusia, Spain.

== Demographics ==
Historical population
Year	Pop.	±%
1999	5,375	—
2000	5,477	+1.9%
2001	5,997	+9.5%
2002	6,492	+8.3%
2003	7,353	+13.3%
2004	7,368	+0.2%
2005	7,600	+3.1%
Source: INE (Spain)

== Largest salad ==
On September 29, 2007, Pulpí tossed the world's largest salad, with 6,700 kilograms (14,740 pounds) of lettuce, tomato, onion, pepper and olives, supervised by 20 cooks over 3 hours. A Guinness World Records judge was present to confirm the new record. The salad was prepared in a container 18 m (59 ft) long and 4.8 m (15.7 ft) wide.

== Pulpí Geode ==
In December 1999, the Pulpí Geode was discovered in the Pilar de Jaravía lead mine by the Grupo Mineralogista de Madri.

== See also ==
- List of municipalities in Almería
