= Phantom quartz =

Variety of quartz

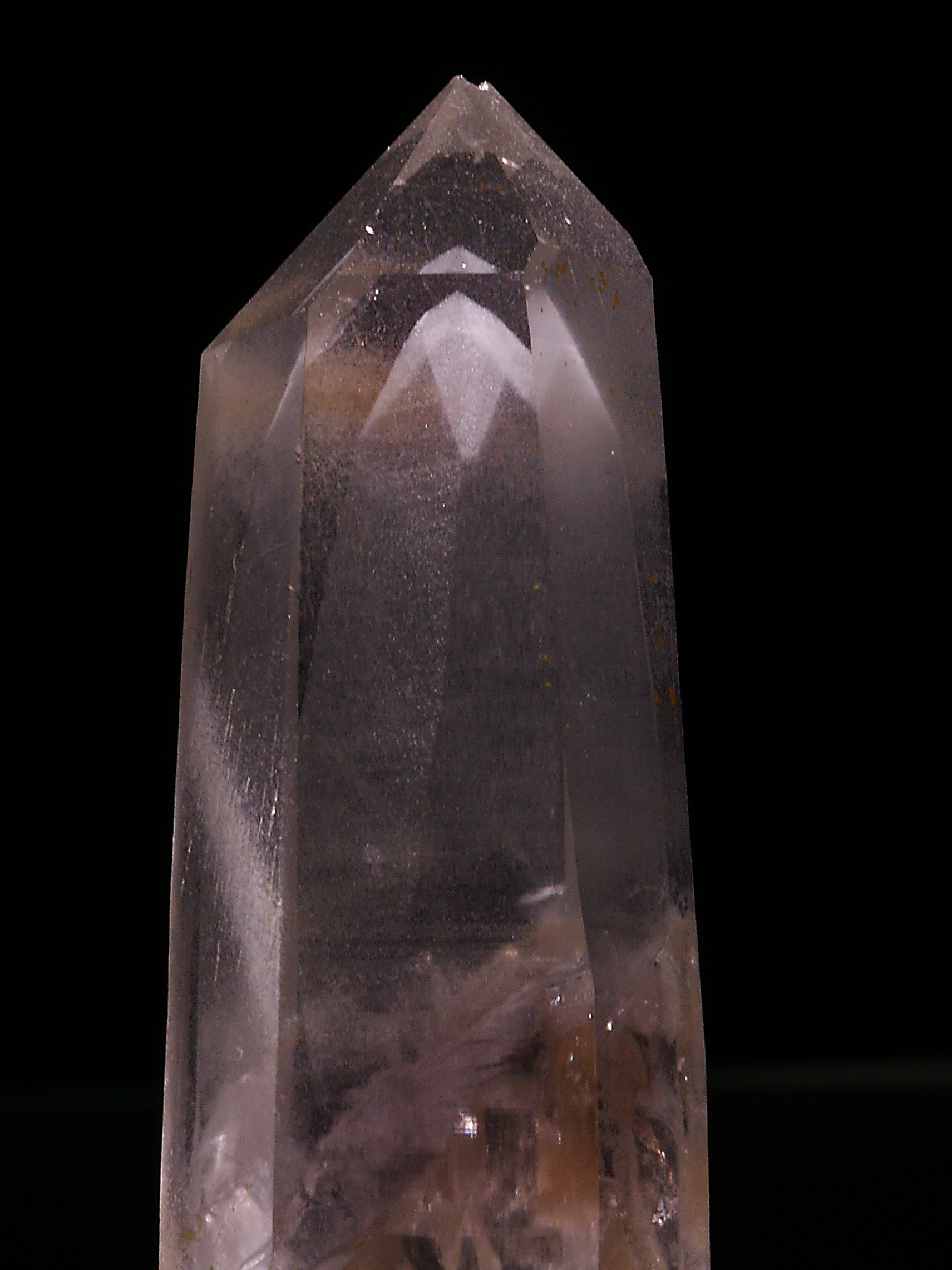
Phantom crystal of quartz

Phantom quartz is a variety of quartz consisting of visible layers of overlapping crystal growths. The outlines of the inner crystals can be seen due to some variation in composition or mineral inclusion making the boundaries between growths visible. The interior crystal layers are known as phantoms. Phantoms can be found in many varieties of quartz.

Like regular quartz, the chemical composition of phantom quartz is silicon dioxide (SiO_{2}).

== See also ==
- Pseudomorph
- List of minerals
