= Mineral variety =

In geology and mineralogy, a mineral variety is a subset of a mineral species or mineraloid with some special characteristic, such as specific impurities or structural defects. For example, amethyst is a variety of quartz with a purple tinge due in part to iron impurities.

Mineral varieties can be further subdivided into sub-varieties.

Unlike mineral species, mineral varieties are not defined or named by the International Mineralogical Association (IMA).

== See also ==
- Mineral
- Mineral group
