= Granitoid =

Category of coarse-grained igneous rocks

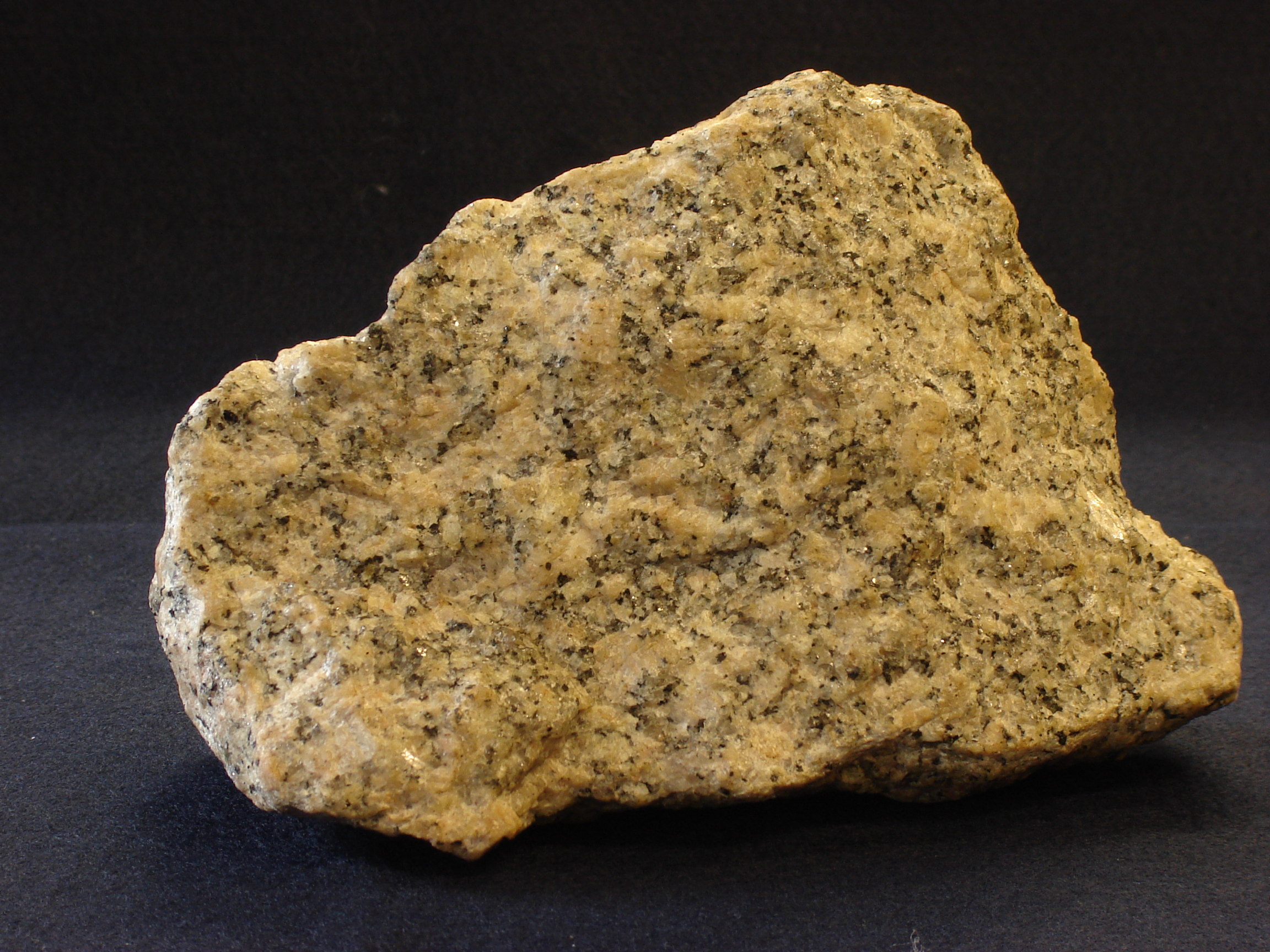
Granite rock hand-sized sample

A granitoid is a broad term referring to a diverse group of coarse-grained igneous rocks that are widely distributed across the globe, covering a significant portion of the Earth's exposed surface and constituting a large part of the continental crust. These rocks are primarily composed of quartz, plagioclase, and alkali feldspar. Granitoids range from plagioclase-rich tonalites to alkali-rich syenites and from quartz-poor monzonites to quartz-rich quartzolites. As only two of the three defining mineral groups (quartz, plagioclase, and alkali feldspar) need to be present for the rock to be called a granitoid, foid-bearing rocks, which predominantly contain feldspars but no quartz, are also granitoids.

== Nomenclature and classification ==
The terms granite and granitic rock are often used interchangeably for granitoids; however, granite is just one particular type of granitoid.

Granitoids are diverse. No classification system for granitoids can give a complete and unique characterization of the origin, compositional evolution, and geodynamic environment for the genesis of a granitoid. Accordingly, multiple granitoid classification systems have been developed such as those based on: geochemistry, modal composition, emplacement depth, and tectonic regime.

== Generalizations ==
Illustration of continental collision as a result of convergence

There are several generalizations that apply to the majority of granitoids. Typically, granitoids occur where orogeny thickens continental crust either by subduction yielding a continental arc or by convergence yielding continental collisions. Generally, the evolution to granitoid magmas requires a thermal disturbance to ascent though continental crust. Most granitoids are generated from crustal anatexis, the partial melting of the crust; however the mantle may contribute both heat and material. Granitoids can occur coeval with volcanic rocks that have equivalent chemical composition (granite–rhyolite, syenite–trachyte, granodiorite–dacite etc.) however, these extrusive rocks are often eroded so just the plutonic rocks outcrop. Granitoids can form in all tectonic environments.

There are numerous exceptions to these generalizations. For example, granitoids can form in anorogenic environments, a granitoid source rock can be from the mantle (for example, at intraplate hotspots) and the melting mechanism can be radiogenic crustal heat.
