= Geology of Cambodia =

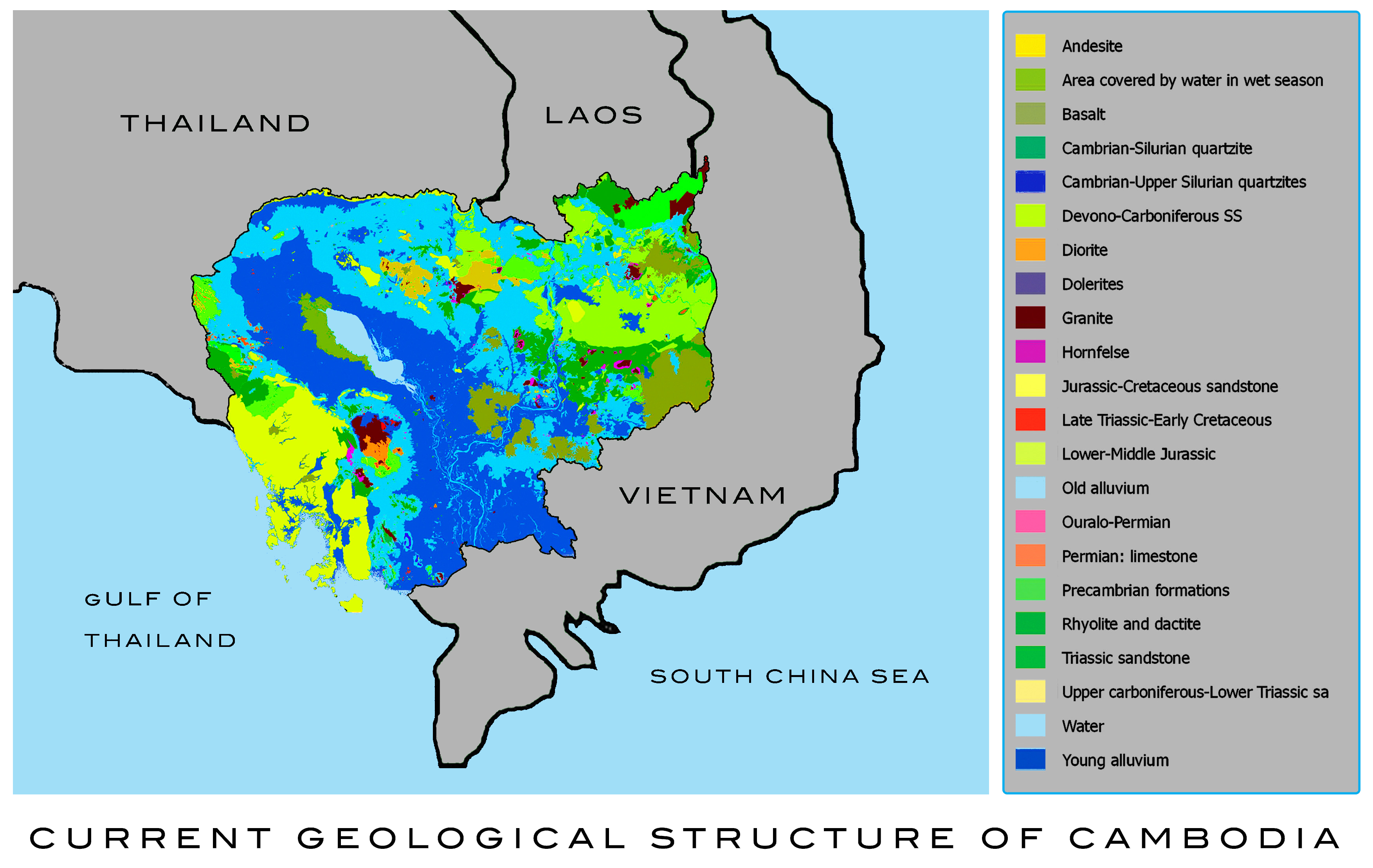
Geologic map of Cambodia

The geology of Cambodia is the study of the nation's rocks, minerals, water and landforms. Cambodia's ancient geologic history in the Precambrian is poorly understood. The region experienced tectonic activity and low-grade metamorphic rock formation throughout the Paleozoic, which a shift to marine conditions and fossil formation during the Permian and through much of the Mesozoic. Few rocks remain from the Cenozoic. Cambodia has comparatively few natural resources, although there is bauxite formed from laterite weathering, as well as phosphorite, iron, gems, limestone and other materials.

== Stratigraphy, tectonics and geologic history ==
There are no dated Precambrian rocks in Cambodia, but the gneiss and schist of the Proterozoic Kontum Massif Vietnam extend into the northeast of the country from Vietnam. High-grade metamorphic rocks that may be from the Precambrian are also found at Pailin in the west. This area has gneiss and amphibolite, diorite, granodiorite and relatively uniform mineralogy including quartz, plagioclase and hornblende.

=== Paleozoic (539-251 million years ago) ===
Extensive Permian limestone rocks are found at Sisophon in the west and to the south at Kampot, containing coral and brachiopod fossils. These fossils helped to establish the age of the limestone which is sometimes interbedded with clastic rocks. There is extensive karst landscape with many caves underlying much of Cambodia.

=== Mesozoic (251-66 million years ago) ===
Triassic rocks are very common in Cambodia, although they do not contain many fossils. Marine Triassic rocks are well documented near Rovieng in the north. Triassic rocks include shale, sandstone, conglomerates and some fragments of volcanic rocks including andesite. The Indosinian Orogeny in the Triassic affected the region with some moderate folding. Hydrocarbon research on the Khorat Plateau suggests that the Indochina Terrane was a series of continental fault blocks separated by Permian rifting. Marine conditions were common, although the later periods were marked by lagoon and continent conditions and red beds formed.

During the Jurassic marine conditions returned. A fossil ammonite was found at one location in eastern Cambodia. The Sre Pok Valley has numerous beds of rock with ammonite fossils, recording deep water sediments near the Vietnamese border by the Middle Jurassic. Continental conditions were the norm and thick sequences of sandstone and conglomerate formed during the Cretaceous. These comprise much of the Cardamome Mountains in the southwest and can be up to one to two kilometers thick. Sometimes these rocks also contain plant and pollen remains.

As far as dinosaurs go there have been no findings in Cambodia however it is not unlikely that they lived there.

=== Cenozoic (66 million years ago-present) ===
There are very few Cenozoic rocks in Cambodia. However, there is quite a bit of evidence from the Quaternary, the last 2.5 million years, particularly in floodplains and valleys where terraces in the sediment are common. However, sometimes these deposits are very thin over underlying bedrock.

== Natural resource geology ==
Cambodia has few natural resources, mainly gold and some non-metallic minerals. Artisanal mining often extracts gold bearing alluvium, which originated from quartz veins in different rocks. Gold was found at Suptrup in 1877 and mined until 1940.

Bauxite, iron ore, tin, greisen and aplite are also known, although only bauxite appears to be economically valuable. Bauxite formed from laterite weathering of Cenozoic basalt on the Haut Chhalong Plateau near the Vietnamese border. Phosphorite and limestone are the main non metallic minerals. Phosphorite forms in caves and fissures from Permian organic material. A small phosphorite mine opened in 1966 with a crushing plant after having first been worked starting in 1919. Cambodia also has gems including sapphire. Pailin, in the area of Bokeo is known for large, high quality zircon crystals.

== History of geologic research ==
Geological mapping of Cambodia was first carried out by the French service, Service Geologique de l'Indochine based in Hanoi in the years between World War I and World War II. Various mineral prospects were explored at that time and again in the 1950s and 1960s with the assistance after independence of France, China in the UN between 1967 and 1970. The whole country was mapped in a reconnaissance level by French geologists and a 1:200,000 scale map with 14 sheets was published. Out of a pre-1975 staff of 60 only eight returned including four technicians after the Khmer Rouge. Currently the responsibility for mapping rests with the Department of Geology and Mines and the Ministry of Industry.
