= Spruce Pine =

Spruce Pine may refer to:

- Pinus glabra, a tree found on the coastal plains of the southern United States, commonly known as the Spruce pine
- Spruce Pine, Alabama, a census-designated place in Franklin County, Alabama, United States
- Spruce Pine, North Carolina, a town in Mitchell County, North Carolina, United States
- Spruce Pine Mining District, a mine in North Carolina, United States
