= Cotterite =

Extremely rare variety of quartz

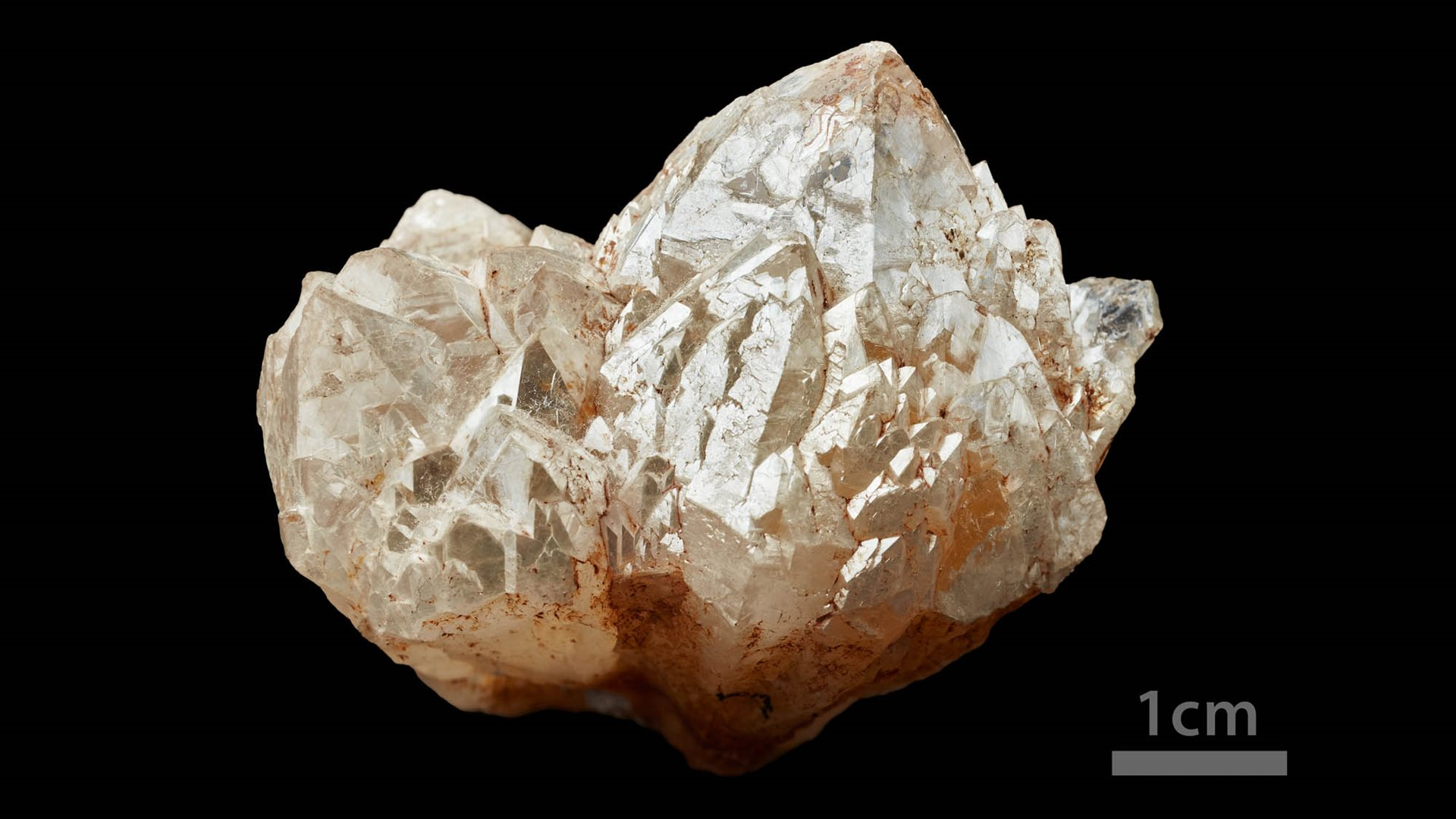
- Cotterite from Rockforest, County Cork, Ireland

General
- Category: Tectosilicate minerals
- Group: Quartz group
- Formula: SiO_{2}
- IMA status: Variety of quartz
- Strunz classification: 4.DA.05
- Dana classification: 75.1.3.1
- Crystal system: Trigonal
- Crystal class: 3 2 (Trapezohedral)

Identification
- Colour: Silvery metallic sheen
- Tenacity: Brittle
- Mohs scale hardness: 7
- Luster: Pearly, metallic
- Streak: White
- Diaphaneity: Opaque
- Specific gravity: 2.65

Cotterite is an extremely rare variety of quartz derived from a single horizontal vein of calcite, quartz and iron-rich mudstone cut through the Carboniferous Limestone in Rockforest, County Cork in Ireland.

Cotterite crystals grow in extremely thin layers that develop very thin cracks as they grow, causing light to be scattered in a frosting effect. This gives cotterite a distinctive pearlescent finish.

It was first discovered in 1874 by Grace Elizabeth Cotter of Mallow, who presented it to the National Museum of Ireland in 1876. Robert Harkness introduced it to the Mineralogical Society of Great Britain and Ireland, naming it cotterite in honour of Cotter. Since then only about 30 specimens have ever been found.

In 2024, a young boy named Ben O’Driscoll discovered a piece of cotterite in a newly ploughed field in Rockforest. This was the first time a specimen of cotterite had been found in 150 years.
