= Crag Mountain =

Crag Mountain is the name of four mountains in the United States, including:

- Crag Mountain (Alaska), 580308N 1361515W
- Crag Mountain (Connecticut), 420023N 0724958W
- Crag Mountain (Massachusetts), 423837N 0722505W
- Crag Mountain (Washington), 464646N 1212526W
