= Quartzolite =

Extremely rare igneous rock made mostly of quartz

Quartzolite at the Q vertex of the QAPF diagram for plutonic rocks

Quartzolite or silexite is an intrusive igneous rock, in which the mineral quartz is more than 90% of the rock's felsic mineral content, with feldspar at up to 10%. Typically, quartz forms more than 60% of the rock, the rest being mostly feldspar although minor amounts of mica or amphibole may also be present. Quartzolite occurs as dykes, sills, veins, bosses and segregation masses; it is also found in association with greisen and pegmatite. Quartzolite is an extremely rare type of rock. No extrusive rock equivalent of quartzolite is known.

== Synonyms ==
The use of the synonym "silexite" is discouraged because it is the French word for chert, which is a sedimentary rock. Other less common synonyms are "igneous quartz" and "peracidite".

== Examples ==
- Chrastava, Czech Republic
- Crag Mountain, Northfield, Massachusetts, United States
- Jabal Hamra, Saudi Arabia
- Keivy, Kola Peninsula, Russia
- Lyon Mountain quadrangle, New York state, United States
- Moulting Pond, Newfoundland, Canada
- Qiabukanzhuota, China
- Saveh County, Iran
- Smaaland Cove, South Georgia
- South Mountains, Arizona, United States
- Torrington, New South Wales, Australia

== Formation ==
Some occurrences of quartzolite are unlikely to have an entirely igneous origin; for example, two types of quartzolite that are associated with deposits of topaz in and around the Mole Granite pluton in Torrington, NSW, are believed to have formed in different ways. One type forms dykes and sills in the granite and in the surrounding metamorphic rocks. The other type has remnants of an earlier granite texture and is found on the outer edges of part of the pluton.
