= High-purity quartz =

Ultra-pure form of quartz used in semiconductor and photovoltaic manufacturing

High-purity quartz is quartz that has extremely high silicon dioxide (SiO_{2}) purity levels. It is used in the manufacture of fused-quartz crucibles which are used in the manufacture of Polycrystalline silicon for semiconductor and photovoltaic manufacturing, as well other applications.

== Definition ==
There is no precise standard for the exact purity level required for quartz to be considered "high-quality quartz", however purities above 99.9% are required for semiconductor manufacturing.

== Applications ==
In semiconductor manufacturing, high-purity quartz is used to produce crucibles employed in the Czochralski process, in which polysilicon is melted at and drawn into a single-crystal ingot.

== Global supply ==
The largest producer of natural high-purity quartz is the Spruce Pine Mining District in western North Carolina, which has unusually pure deposits. The Spruce Pine mines are operated by the Belgian company Sibelco and the Norwegian company The Quartz Corp. BloombergNEF estimated in 2024 that the Spruce Pine region produced 80 percent of the high purity quartz sand needed for the world's photovoltaic and semiconductor industries.

Following Hurricane Helene, the concentration of the world's supply of high purity quartz in one location drew attention, after the mines were temporarily closed due to the storm damage. A long term disruption in production was considered a serious supply chain vulnerability.

== See also ==
- Spruce Pine Mining District
- Czochralski process
- Monocrystalline silicon
- Fused quartz
