= Greisen =

Highly altered granitic rock or pegmatite

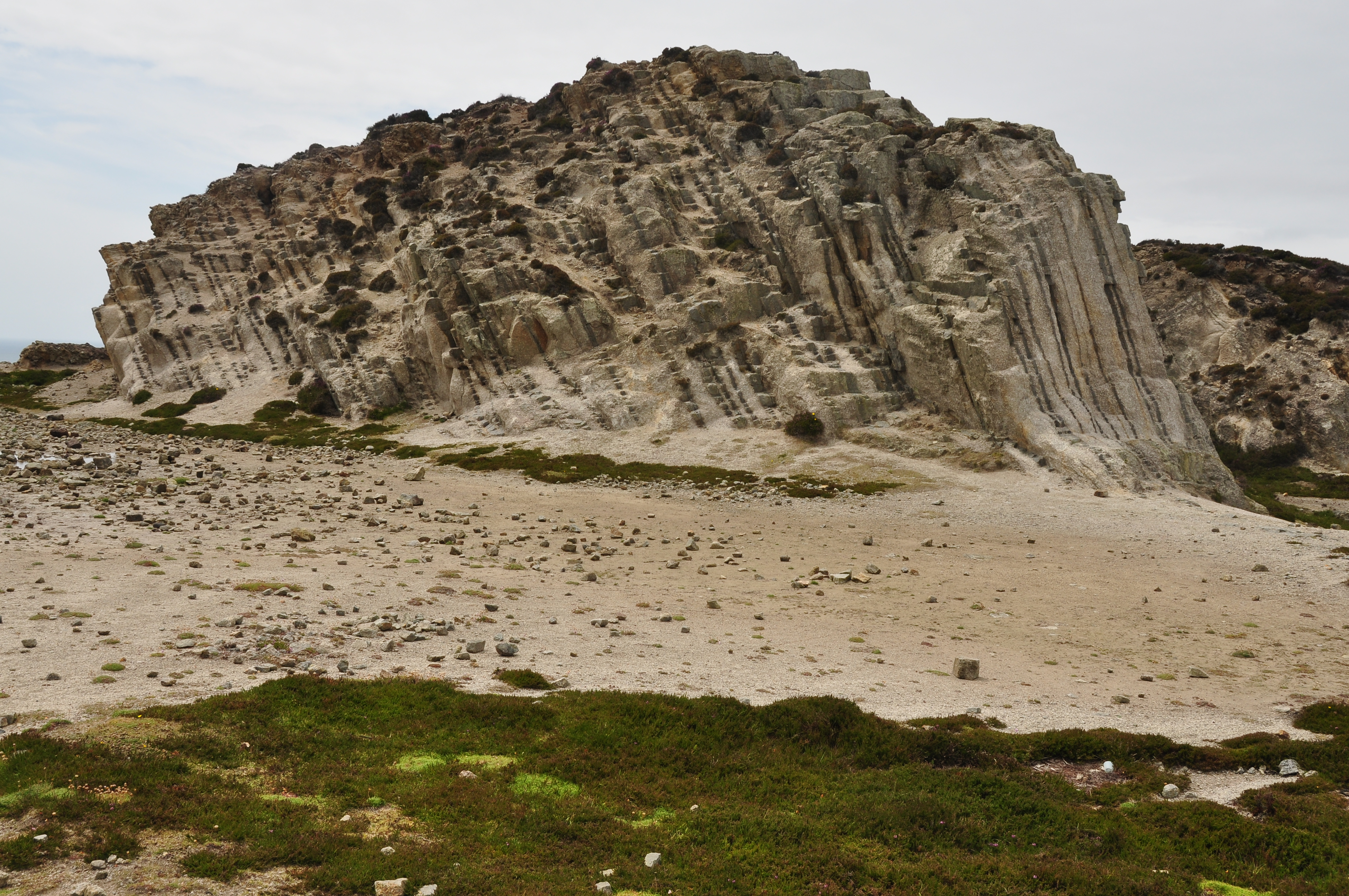
Granite (light) with sheeted veins of greisen (dark) at Cligga Head, Cornwall

Greisen is a highly altered granitic rock or pegmatite, usually composed predominantly of quartz and micas (mostly muscovite). Greisen is formed by self-generated alteration of a granite and is a class of moderate- to high-temperature magmatic-hydrothermal alteration related to the late-stage release of volatiles dissolved in a magma during the solidification of that magma.

Greisens are usually variably altered rocks, grading from coarse, crystalline granite, commonly vuggy with miarolitic cavities, through to quartz and muscovite rich rocks, which may be locally rich in topaz, tourmaline, cassiterite, fluorite, beryl, wolframite, siderite, molybdenite and other sulfide minerals, and other accessory minerals. They may occur as small to large veins, or large zones in the roof of some granites. The rocks can sometimes be mined as ores of tin and other minerals.

== Petrogenesis ==
Greisens are formed by endogenous alteration of granite during the cooling stages of emplacement. Greisen fluids are formed by granites as the last highly gas- and water-rich phases of complete crystallisation of granite melts. This fluid is forced through the interstitial spaces of the granite into veins and pools at the upper margins, where boiling and rock alteration occur.

=== Alteration facies ===
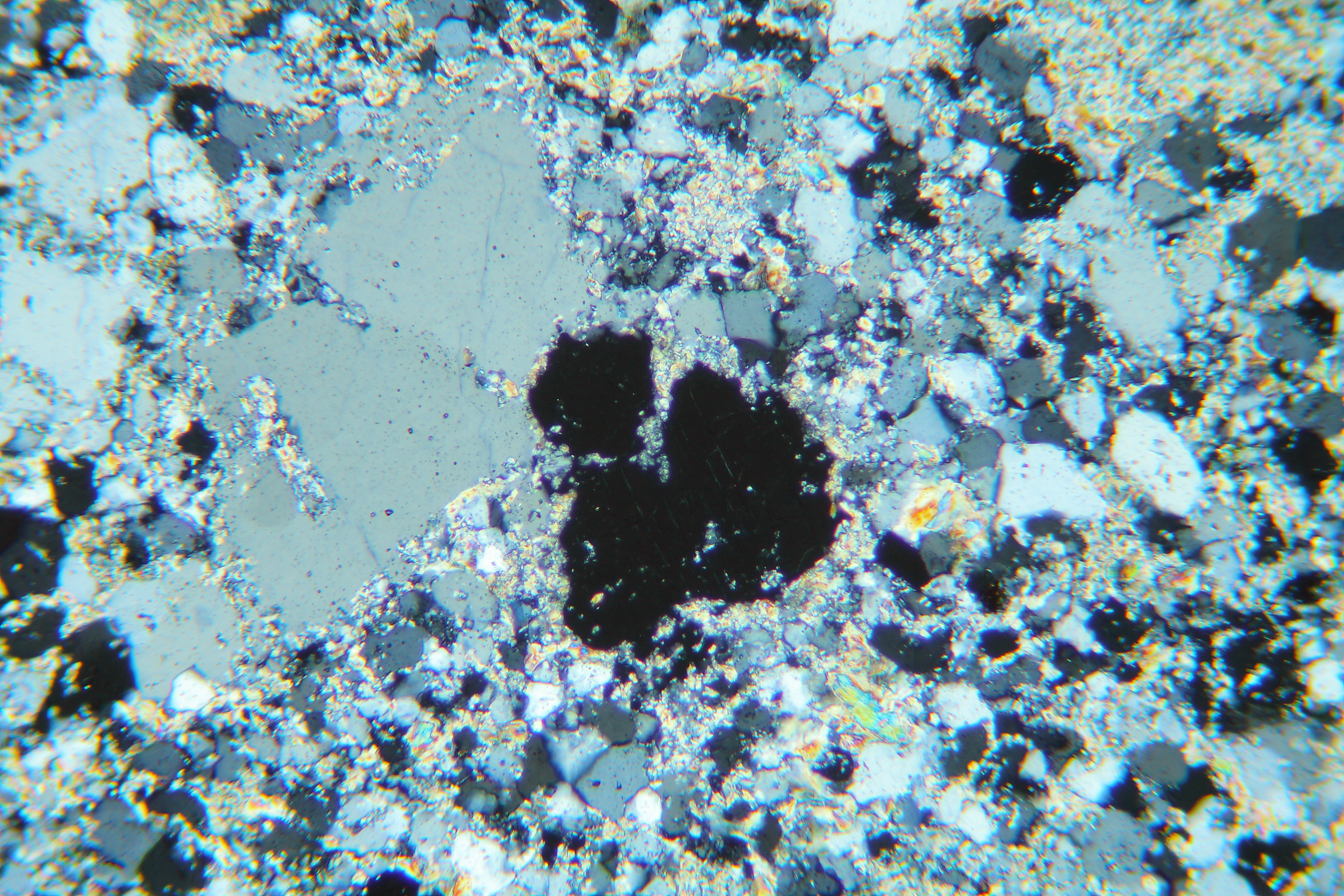
Thin section of greisen containing fluorite (black), from the Ore Mountains

- Incipient greisen (granite): addition of muscovite ± chlorite, topaz, tourmaline, and fluorite (original texture of granites retained).
- Greisenized granite: quartz-muscovite-topaz-fluorite, ± tourmaline (some original texture of granites retained).
- Massive greisen: quartz-muscovite ± topaz ± fluorite ± tourmaline (typically no original texture preserved). Tourmaline can be ubiquitous as disseminations, concentrated or diffuse clots, or late fracture fillings. Greisen may form in any wallrock environment, but typically in granites and metamorphic rocks.

== Greisen environments ==
Greisens appear to be restricted to intrusions which are emplaced high in the crust, generally at a depth between 0.5 and 5 km, as the hydrous fluid separation from granite to produce greisenation cannot occur deeper than about 5 kilometres. The roof or upper aureole is mostly sealed shut to prevent most fluids escaping. This sealing is largely due to hornfelsing and silicification of the overlying rocks, and fracturing of these rock typically forms greisen veins.

They are generally associated mostly with potassic plutonic rocks; Alkali feldspar granite, and are rare in less potassic rocks like granodiorite or diorite. Greisens are prospective for mineralisation because the last fluids of granite crystallization tend to concentrate incompatible metals such as tin, tungsten, molybdenum and beryllium, and in places other metals such as tantalum, gold, silver, and copper.

Tectonically, greisen granites are generally associated with generation of S-type suites of granites in thick arc and back-arc fold belts where subducted sedimentary and felsic rock is melted.

== Distribution ==
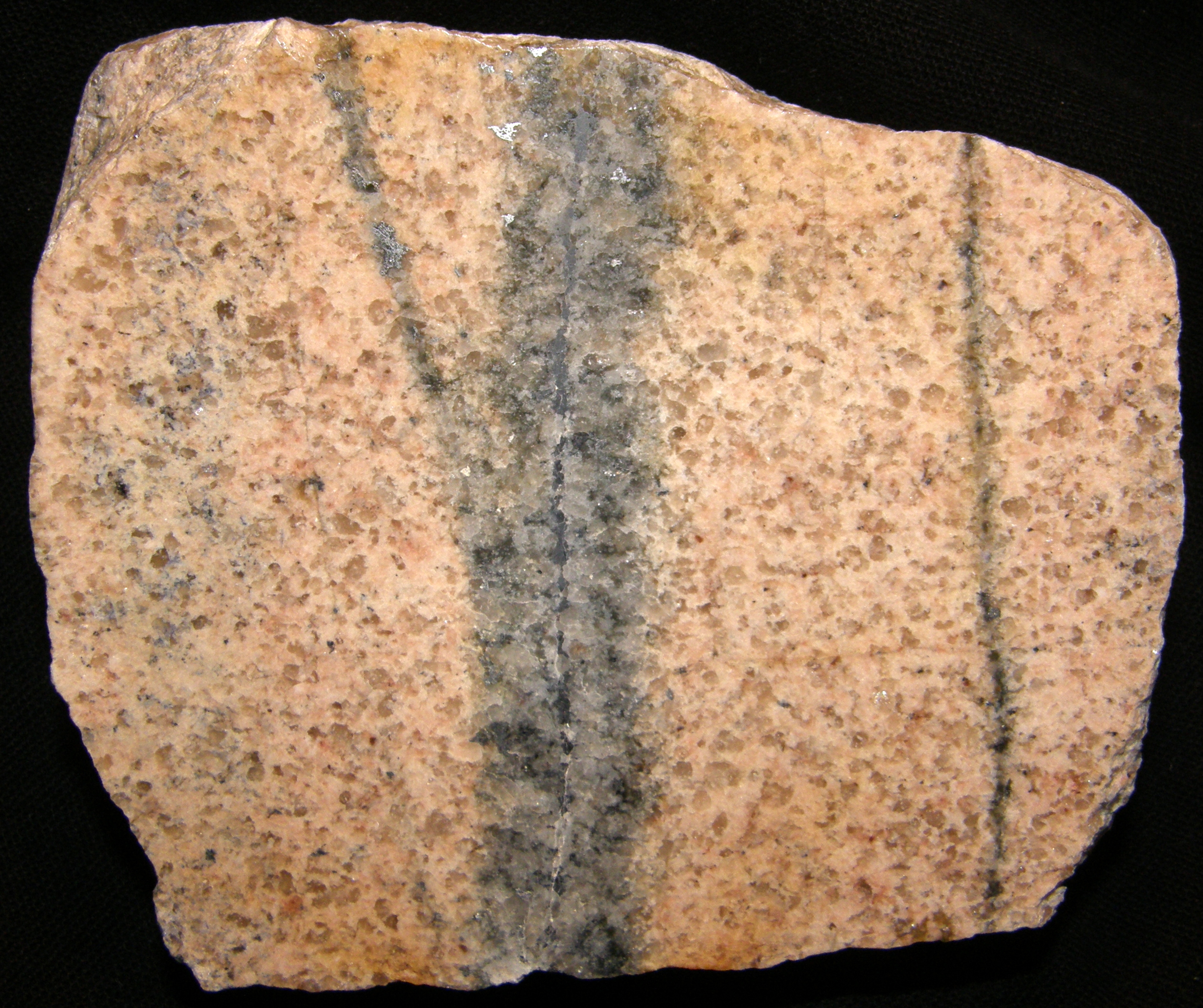
Dark greisen veins of cassiterite and arsenopyrite in granite, Ore Mountains

Examples of greisen are:

- Tin and tungsten deposits of Cornwall
- Ardlethan, New South Wales, Australia (tin-antimony greisen)
- Timbarra gold mine, New South Wales, Australia (gold greisen deposit)
- Anchor Mine, Lottah, Tasmania, Australia (tin copper topaz greisen)
- Pitinga topaz granite, Brazil (tin, topaz, beryl)
- Lost River, Alaska, US (tin greisen)
- Sisson Brook, Burnt Hill and other deposits, New Brunswick, Canada (tin-tungsten-molybdenum greisen)
- Ore Mountains, Czech Republic (tin greisen)
- Panasqueira Mine, Portugal Tin and Tungsten deposit
- The Tin Range Tungsten-Tin deposit, Stewart Island/Rakiura, New Zealand

== See also ==
- Granite – Type of igneous rock; specifically for S-type and I-type distinction
- List of rock textures – List of rock textural and morphological terms
- Metasomatism – Chemical alteration of a rock by hydrothermal and other fluids
- Ore genesis – How the various types of mineral deposits form within the Earth's crust
- Quartzolite – Extremely rare igneous rock made mostly of quartz
