= Robert Harkness =

British geologist and mineralogist (1816–1878)

- Born: 28 July 1816; Ormskirk
- Died: 4 October 1878 (aged 62); Dublin
- Education: University of Edinburgh
- Occupations: geologist, mineralogist
- Awards: FRS, FRSE, FGS

Professor Robert Harkness FRS FRSE FGS (28 July 1816 – 4 October 1878), was a British geologist and mineralogist.

== Early life ==
Robert Harkness was born in Ormskirk on 28 July 1816. His family moved to south-west Scotland when he was young and he was educated at the high school, Dumfries. From 1833 to 1834 he studied at the University of Edinburgh, where he acquired an interest in geology from the teachings of Robert Jameson and JD Forbes. Returning to Ormskirk, he worked zealously at the local geology, especially on the Coal-measures and New Red Sandstone, his first paper (read before the Manchester Geol. Soc. in 1843) being on The Climate of the Coal Epoch.

== Family and career ==
In 1848, he returned to reside in Dumfries with his family. Here he commenced to work on the Silurian rocks of the SW of Scotland; in 1849 he carried his investigations into Cumberland. In these regions during the next few years, he discovered much information of the strata and their Fossils, especially graptolites, and elaborated in papers read before the Geological Society of London. He wrote also on the New Red rocks of the north of England and Scotland.

As the successor to William Nicol, in 1853, Harkness was appointed professor of geology in Queen's College, Cork, and in 1856 he was elected fellow of the Royal Society. During this period, he wrote some articles on the geology of parts of Ireland, and exercised much influence as a teacher, but he returned to England during his vacations and devoted himself assiduously to the geology of the Lake district. He was also a constant attendant at the meetings of the British Association. In 1854 he was elected a Fellow of the Royal Society of Edinburgh, his proposer being John Hutton Balfour.

In 1876, the syllabus for the Queen's Colleges in Ireland was altered, and Professor Harkness was required to lecture not only on geology, palaeontology, mineralogy and physical geography, but also on zoology and botany. Due to the strain, he decided to relinquish his post and retired.

He died soon after, in Dublin, on 4 October 1878.

== Legacy ==
There is a memoir of Harkness, by J. G. Goodchild, in the Transactions of the Cumberland Association No. viii. (with portrait). In memory of Harkness, his sister established two Harkness scholarships. One scholarship (of the value of about £35 a year, tenable for three years) for women, tenable at either Girton or Newnham College, Cambridge, is awarded triennially to the best candidate in an examination in geology and palaeontology, provided that proficiency be shown; the other, for men, is vested in the hands of the university of Cambridge, and is awarded annually, any member of the university being eligible who has graduated as a B.A., provided that not more than three years have elapsed since the 19th day of December next following his final examination for the degree of bachelor of arts.
