= Spruce Pine Mining District =

Part of the valley of the North Toe River in North Carolina, US

- Stratigraphic range: 450-470 Ma
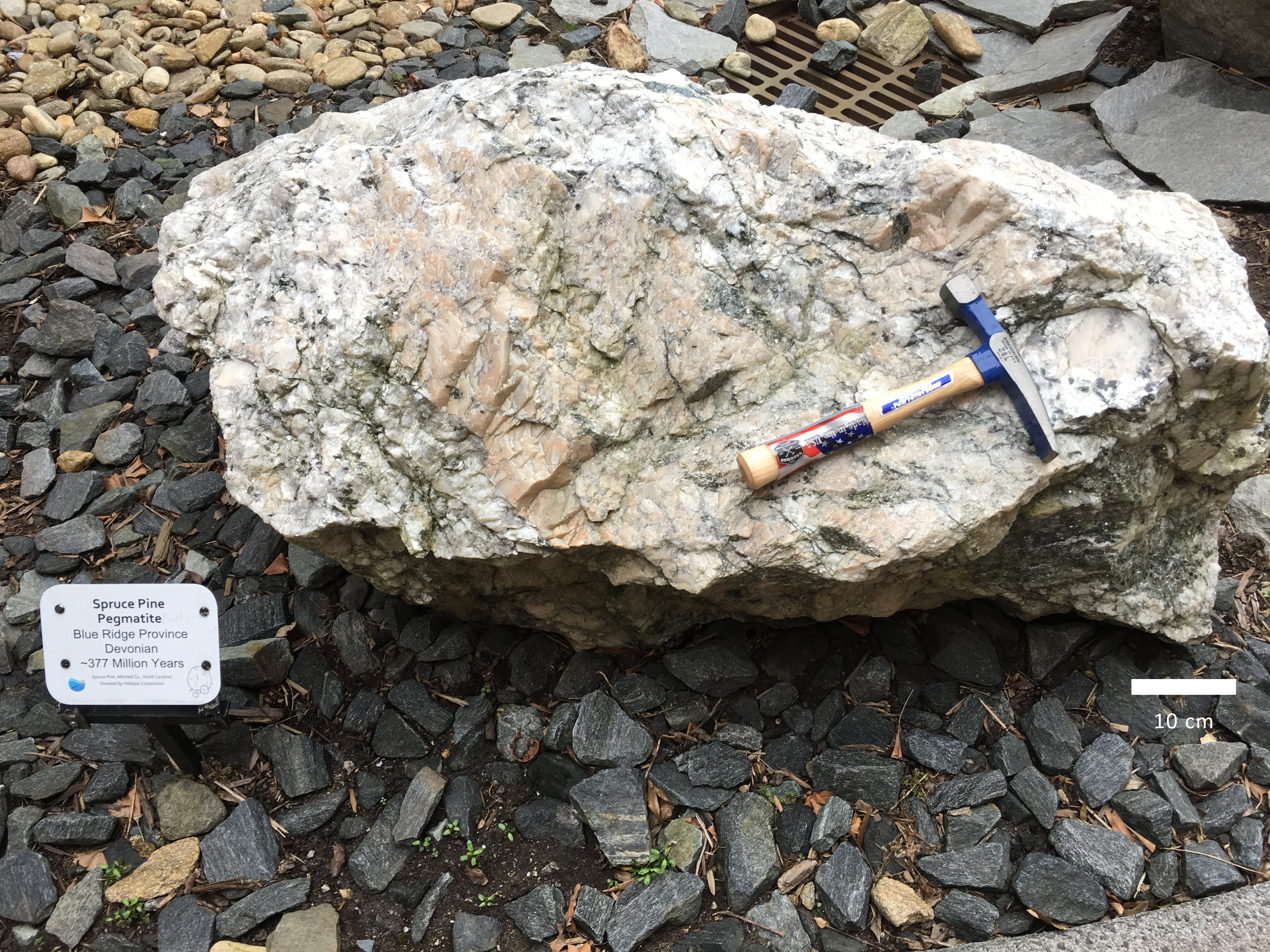
- Sample of the Spruce Pine Pegmatite
- Type: Geological formation
- Unit of: Tugaloo Terrane
- Overlies: Cranberry Gneiss
- Thickness: up to 10,500 feet (3,200 m)

Location
- Location: Spruce Pine, NC
- Coordinates: 35.942922°N 82.08268°W
- Region: Appalachian Mountains
- Country: United States

Type section
- Named for: Spruce Pine, NC

The Spruce Pine Mining District is a swath of the valley of the North Toe River in the Blue Ridge Mountains of northwestern North Carolina. The area is mined for its mica, kaolin, quartz and feldspar. Spruce Pine district is one of the largest suppliers of high-purity quartz, which is used in the manufacture of silicon for integrated circuits. The district is named after the town of Spruce Pine, which is located in the middle of the region and is the hub of major mining activity there. The district is approximately 25 miles (40 km) long and 5 miles (8.0 km) wide.

== Regional geology ==
The district is located within the Blue Ridge upland region, and is bounded on the eastern edge by the Blue Ridge Front. The pegmatites intruded into the Ashe Formation. The pegmatites and country rock are part of the Spruce Pine thrust block, the highest thrust sheet of the Blue Ridge belt, the latter being part of the Tugaloo Terrane which was accreted to North America during the Taconic Orogeny. A more refined age for the pegmatites within the district has been found through ^{40}Ar/^{39}Ar dating of micas. They have been dated to approximately 336 million years old. The approximate age of the whole district was taken from Sm/Nd dating in the hornblendes, and was found to be from 470 to 450 million years old. This puts the oldest rocks in the district within the Ordovician period. The master stream of the district is the North Toe River.

== Igneous Rock Units ==
=== Pegmatite ===
Major minerals include plagioclase, microcline, quartz, and muscovite. Perthitic textures on the microcline are possible. Minor minerals include biotite and garnet. The size of this unit ranges from inches to thousands of feet. It will weather into light-colored soils.

=== Microcline ===
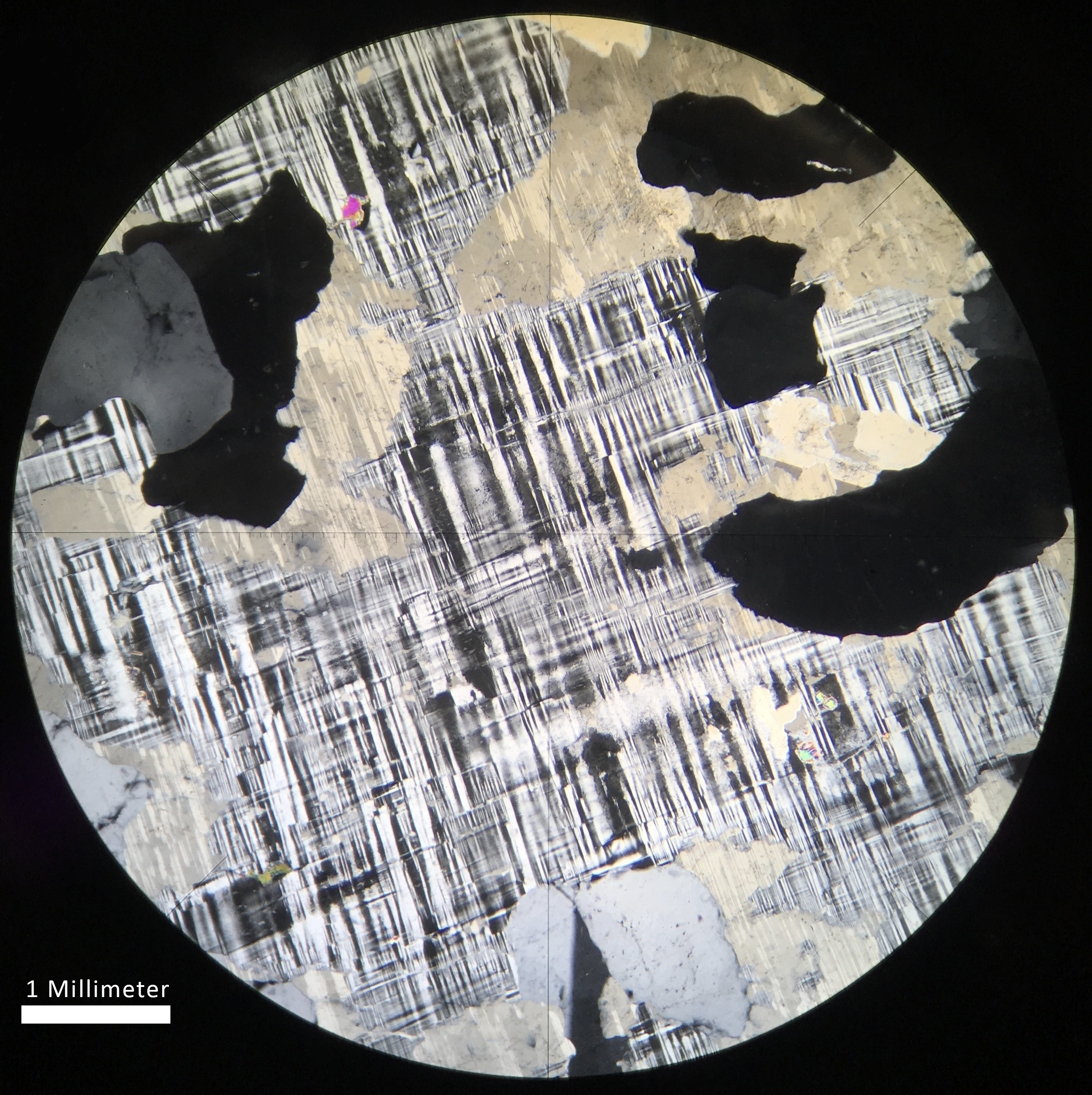
Thin section of microcline from the Spruce Pine Pegmatite showing a perthitic texture

Minerals in this unit include talc, amphibole, chlorite, and chrysotile. It will weather to a dark-colored, organic-poor soil.

== Metamorphic Rock Units ==
=== Quartzite ===
This is a relatively rare unit within the district. The mica and hornblende rock units grade into it. Only about five percent of the rock units within the district are composed of quartzite.

=== Hornblende Rocks ===
Major minerals include hornblende, quartz, plagioclase, and andesine. Minor minerals include epidote, zoisite, garnet, and sphene. Metamorphic textures in these rocks can either be schistose or gneissic. They transition into the mica gneiss and schist units.

=== Mica Gneiss and Mica Schist ===
Major minerals in both include mica, quartz, plagioclase, and muscovite. Minor minerals for both include garnet, ilmenite, epidote, and apatite. The texture of the mica gneiss has homogenous mineral layers, with less foliation than the mica schist. It weathers into a dark red soil. The texture of the mica schist is made up of heterogenous layers of minerals. It weathers into a micaceous, brown soil that is distinct from the other soil types in the district.

=== Cranberry Gneiss ===
The Cranberry Gneiss rock unit can be found interbedded with other units in the district.

== Significance in the mining industry ==
The district is known for producing multiple types of commercial materials. It holds the Earth's largest concentration of pure quartz. Ground micas are collected from the mining of other minerals in the district. Sheet mica also exists, but it is not mined. Feldspars are another major mineral that is mined here. Some companies that mine in the Spruce Pine district include: the Feldspar Corporation, Covia, K-T Feldspar, Sibelco Group and US Gypsum.

=== Role in Semiconductor Manufacturing ===
The Spruce Pine district supplies approximately 70–90% of the world's high-purity quartz (HPQ), a critical material for semiconductor and solar photovoltaic (PV) manufacturing. This quartz is processed into fused silica crucibles used in the Czochralski method, the dominant method for producing monocrystalline silicon ingots. At temperatures exceeding 1400°C, molten silicon reacts with almost all materials except quartz, which maintains structural integrity while minimizing impurity transfer. Each crucible costs thousands of dollars and lasts approximately 400 hours of operation, with crucibles accounting for ~30% of silicon ingot production costs.

=== Global Economic Impact ===
Industry analysts describe Spruce Pine as a "single point of failure" for the semiconductor supply chain, with Ed Conway’s Material World (2023) suggesting disruption could halt global chip production within six months. While synthetic quartz alternatives exist, they cost 5–10× more, making them economically unviable for solar PV manufacturing. China produces only 5,000 tons of HPQ annually, though aims to expand to 20,000 tons, while historical suppliers like Brazil and Russia lack comparable reserves.

Operational risks were highlighted in 2024 when Hurricane Helene disrupted mining operations, though stockpiled crucibles prevented immediate shortages. Sibelco confirmed halting operations due to flooding and infrastructure damage, with the storm causing over 24 inches of rainfall in 24 hours. A 2008 fire at Spruce Pine similarly caused polysilicon price spikes, demonstrating systemic fragility.
