= Crag Mountain (Massachusetts) =

Mountain in Massachusetts, United States

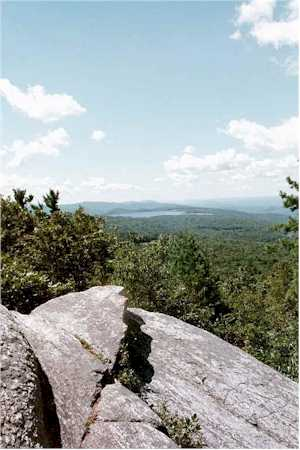
- View from Crag Mountain; Northfield Mountain Reservoir in distance

Highest point
- Elevation: 1,503 ft (458 m)
- Parent peak: Brush Mountain
- Coordinates: 42°38′36″N 72°25′05″W

Geography
- Location: Northfield, Massachusetts

Geology
- Rock age: 400 million years
- Mountain type(s): Arête; quartzite

Climbing
- Easiest route: Metacomet-Monadnock Trail

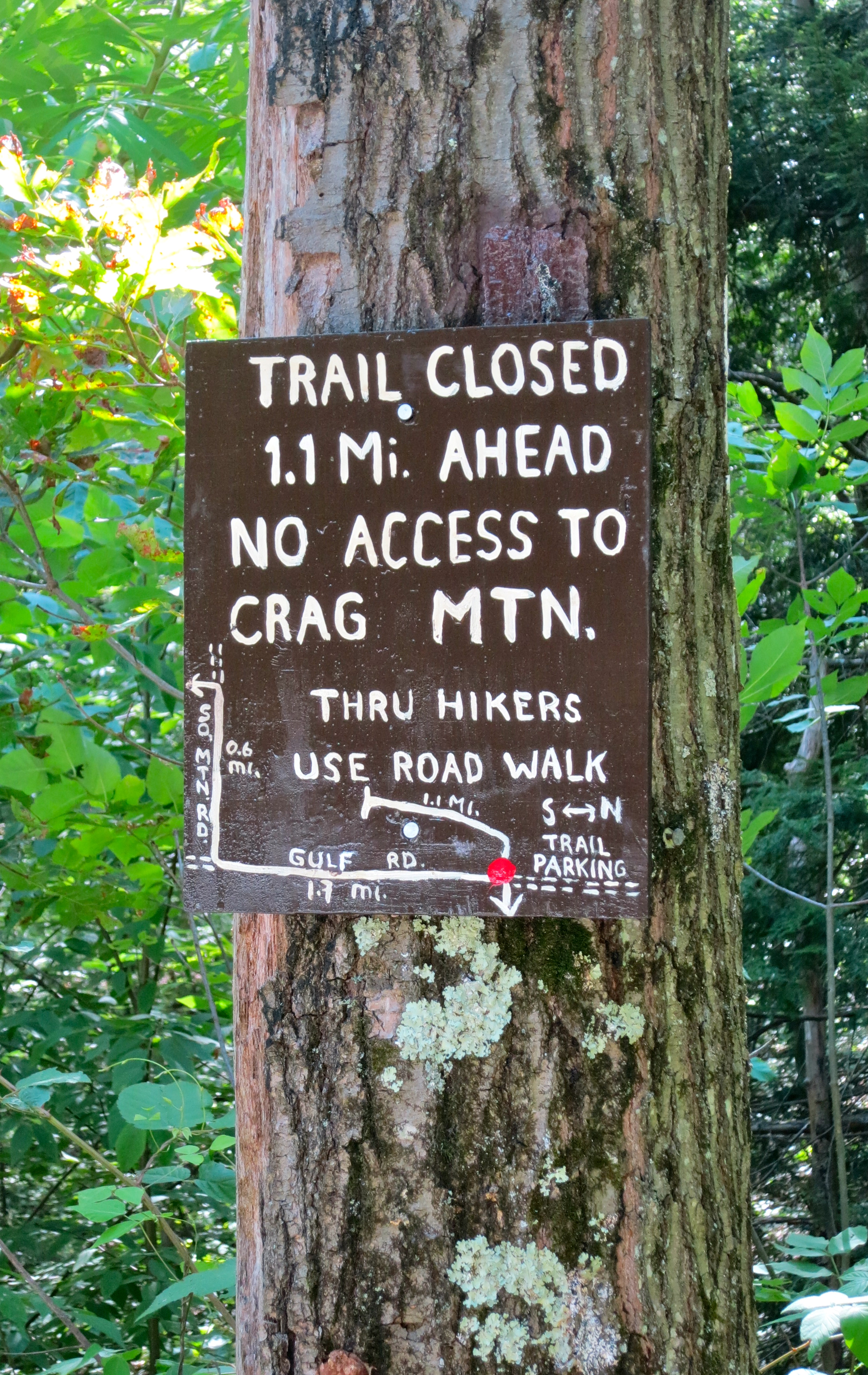
Crag Mountain closure sign located at the Gulf Road M & M trailhead due to landowner's request of the Berkshire Chapter AMC.

Crag Mountain, 1,503 feet (458 m), of the Bald Hills region of east Franklin County, Massachusetts is the southern and most apparent summit of Brush Mountain, 1,507 feet (459 m). Narrow and precipitous, the mountain offers expansive views from its open, knife-edge summit. Crag Mountain is composed of quartzite, a weather-resistant metamorphic rock. The 114 mile (183 km) Metacomet-Monadnock Trail traverses its summit ridge. Crag Mountain is located within the town of Northfield, Massachusetts.

The west side of Crag Mountain flows into Fourmile Brook, then into the Connecticut River, which flows into Long Island Sound. The east side flows into Jack's Brook and Keyup Brook, then into the Millers River, thence the Connecticut River and Long Island Sound.

== Recreation ==
Currently (August 2018), the Crag Mountain summit is closed to thru hikers on the M & M Trail at the request of the landowner. The trail remains blazed with white blazes from Gulf Road in a southerly direction to within a half mile of the summit (marked with three USGS benchmarks). Orange blazes and a well-marked trail continue southerly to the open summit, which affords views of Mt. Monadnock, Mt. Wachusett, and what appears to be Stratton Mountain (VT) to the northwest.
