= Quartz =

Mineral made of silicon and oxygen

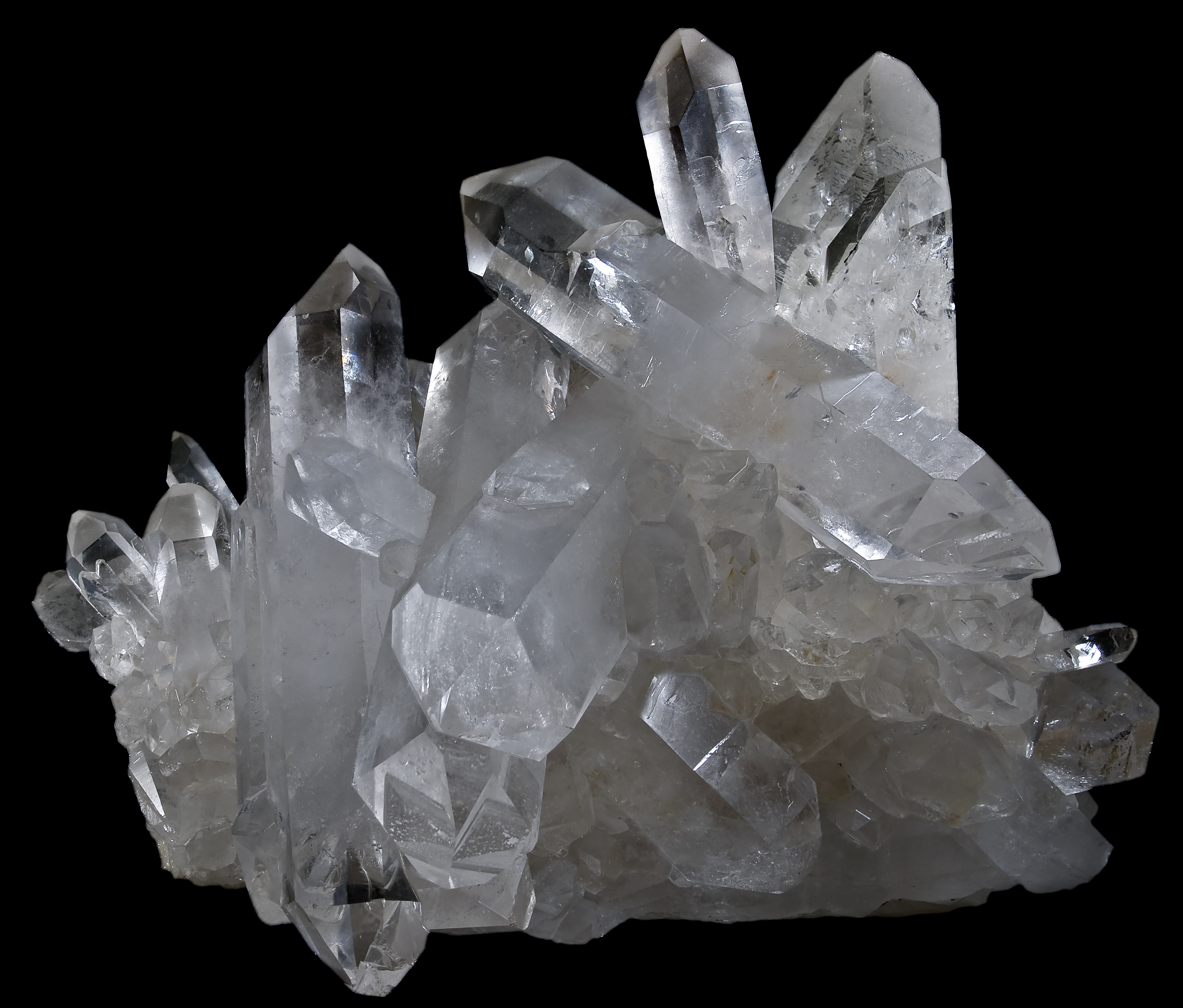
- Quartz crystal cluster from Brazil

General
- Category: Tectosilicate minerals
- Group: Quartz group
- Formula: SiO_{2}
- IMA symbol: Qz
- Strunz classification: 4.DA.05 (oxides)
- Dana classification: 75.01.03.01 (tectosilicates)
- Crystal system: α-quartz: trigonal β-quartz: hexagonal
- Crystal class: α-quartz: trapezohedral (class 3 2) β-quartz: trapezohedral (class 6 2 2)
- Space group: α-quartz: P3_{2}21 (no. 154) β-quartz: P6_{2}22 (no. 180) or P6_{4}22 (no. 181)
- Unit cell: a = 4.9133 Å, c = 5.4053 Å; Z = 3

Identification
- Formula mass: 60.083 g·mol^{−1}
- Color: Colorless, pink, orange, white, green, yellow, blue, purple, dark brown, or black
- Crystal habit: 6-sided prism ending in 6-sided pyramid (typical), drusy, fine-grained to microcrystalline, massive
- Twinning: Common Dauphine law, Brazil law, and Japan law
- Cleavage: none
- Fracture: Conchoidal
- Tenacity: Brittle
- Mohs scale hardness: 7 – lower in impure varieties (defining mineral)
- Luster: Vitreous – waxy to dull when massive
- Streak: White
- Diaphaneity: Transparent to nearly opaque
- Specific gravity: 2.65; variable 2.59–2.63 in impure varieties
- Optical properties: Uniaxial (+)
- Refractive index: n_{ω} = 1.543–1.545 n_{ε} = 1.552–1.554
- Birefringence: +0.009 (B-G interval)
- Pleochroism: None
- Melting point: 1670 °C (β tridymite); 1713 °C (β cristobalite)
- Solubility: Insoluble at STP; 1 ppm_{mass} at 400 °C and 500 lb/in^{2} to 2600 ppm_{mass} at 500 °C and 1500 lb/in^{2}
- Other characteristics: Lattice: hexagonal, piezoelectric, may be triboluminescent, chiral (hence optically active if not racemic)

Major varieties
- Rock crystal: Clear
- Milky quartz: White
- Amethyst: Violet
- Citrine: Yellow
- Smoky quartz: Gray to black, brown
- Rose quartz: Pink

Quartz is a hard mineral composed of silica (silicon dioxide). Its atoms are linked in a continuous framework of SiO_{4} silicon–oxygen tetrahedra, with each oxygen atom being shared between two tetrahedra, giving an overall chemical formula of SiO_{2}. Therefore, quartz is classified structurally as a framework silicate mineral and compositionally as an oxide mineral. Quartz is the second most common mineral or mineral group in Earth's lithosphere, comprising about 12% by mass.

Quartz exists in two forms, the normal α-quartz and the high-temperature β-quartz, both of which are chiral. The transformation from α-quartz to β-quartz takes place abruptly at 573 °C (846 K; 1,063 °F). Since the transformation is accompanied by a significant change in volume, it can easily induce microfracturing of ceramics or rocks passing through this temperature threshold.

There are many different varieties of quartz, several of which are classified as gemstones. Since antiquity, varieties of quartz have been the most commonly used minerals in the making of jewelry and hardstone carvings, especially in Europe and Asia.

Quartz is the mineral defining the value of 7 on the Mohs scale of hardness, a qualitative scratch method for determining the hardness of a material.

== Etymology ==
The word quartz is derived from the German word Quarz, which had the same form in the first half of the 14th century in Middle High German and in East Central German and which came from the Polish dialect term kwardy, which corresponds to the Czech term tvrdý ('hard'). Some sources, however, attribute the word's origin to the Saxon word Querkluftertz, meaning 'cross-vein ore'.

The Ancient Greeks referred to quartz as κρύσταλλος (krustallos) meaning 'crystal', derived from the Ancient Greek κρύος (kruos) meaning 'icy cold', because some philosophers (including Theophrastus) believed the mineral to be a form of supercooled ice. Today, the term rock crystal is sometimes used as an alternative name for transparent, coarsely crystalline quartz.

== Early studies ==
Roman naturalist Pliny the Elder believed quartz to be ice, permanently frozen after great lengths of time. He supported this idea by saying that quartz is found near glaciers in the Alps, but not in warm climates. This idea persisted until at least the 17th century.

In the 17th century, Nicolas Steno's study of quartz paved the way for modern crystallography. He discovered that, regardless of a quartz crystal's size or shape, its long prism faces always meet at a perfect 60° angle, thereby establishing the law of constancy of interfacial angles.

== Crystal habit and structure ==
Crystal structure of α-quartz (red balls are oxygen, gray are silicon)

Crystal structure of β-quartz

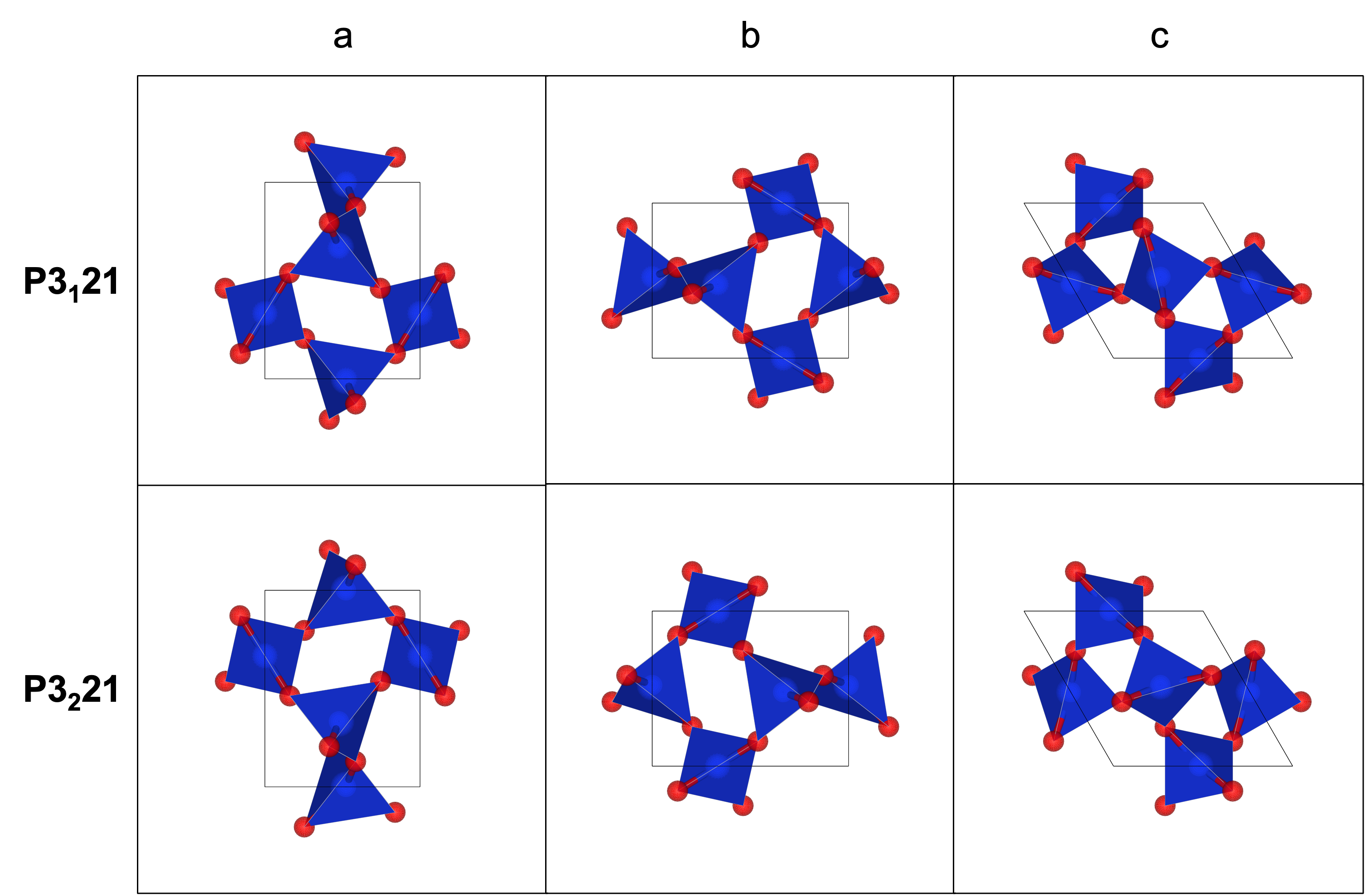
A chiral pair of α-quartz

Quartz can form as two distinct polymorphs depending on the temperature and pressure: α-quartz (also called low quartz or normal quartz) and β-quartz (also called quartz-beta or high quartz). α-quartz crystallizes in the trigonal crystal system, while β-quartz has greater symmetry and crystallizes in the hexagonal crystal system. The transition from α-quartz to β-quartz occurs abruptly at 573 °C (1,063 °F; 846 K) at ambient pressure; the transition temperature is greater at higher pressures. β-quartz is unstable at room temperature; therefore, all quartz at room temperature is α-quartz regardless of which polymorph it formed as.

Both polymorphs of quartz can occur in two different space groups depending on the chirality. Above the transition temperature, α-quartz in P3_{1}21 (space group 152) becomes β-quartz in P6_{4}22 (space group 181), and α-quartz in P3_{2}21 (space group 154) becomes β-quartz in P6_{2}22 (space group 180).

These space groups are truly chiral (they each belong to the 11 enantiomorphous pairs). Both α-quartz and β-quartz are examples of chiral crystal structures composed of achiral building blocks (SiO_{4} tetrahedra in the present case). The transformation between α- and β-quartz only involves a comparatively minor rotation of the tetrahedra with respect to one another, without a change in the way they are linked. However, there is a significant change in volume during this transition, and this can result in significant microfracturing in ceramics during firing, in ornamental stone after a fire and in rocks of the Earth's crust exposed to high temperatures, thereby damaging materials containing quartz and degrading their physical and mechanical properties.

The ideal crystal shape for quartz is a six-sided prism terminating with six-sided pyramid-like rhombohedrons at each end. In nature, quartz crystals are often twinned (with twin right-handed and left-handed quartz crystals), distorted, or so intergrown with adjacent crystals of quartz or other minerals as to only show part of this shape, or to lack obvious crystal faces altogether and appear massive.

Well-formed crystals typically form as a druse (a layer of crystals lining a void), of which quartz geodes are particularly fine examples. The crystals are attached at one end to the enclosing rock, and only one termination pyramid is present. However, doubly terminated crystals do occur where they develop freely without attachment, for instance, within gypsum.

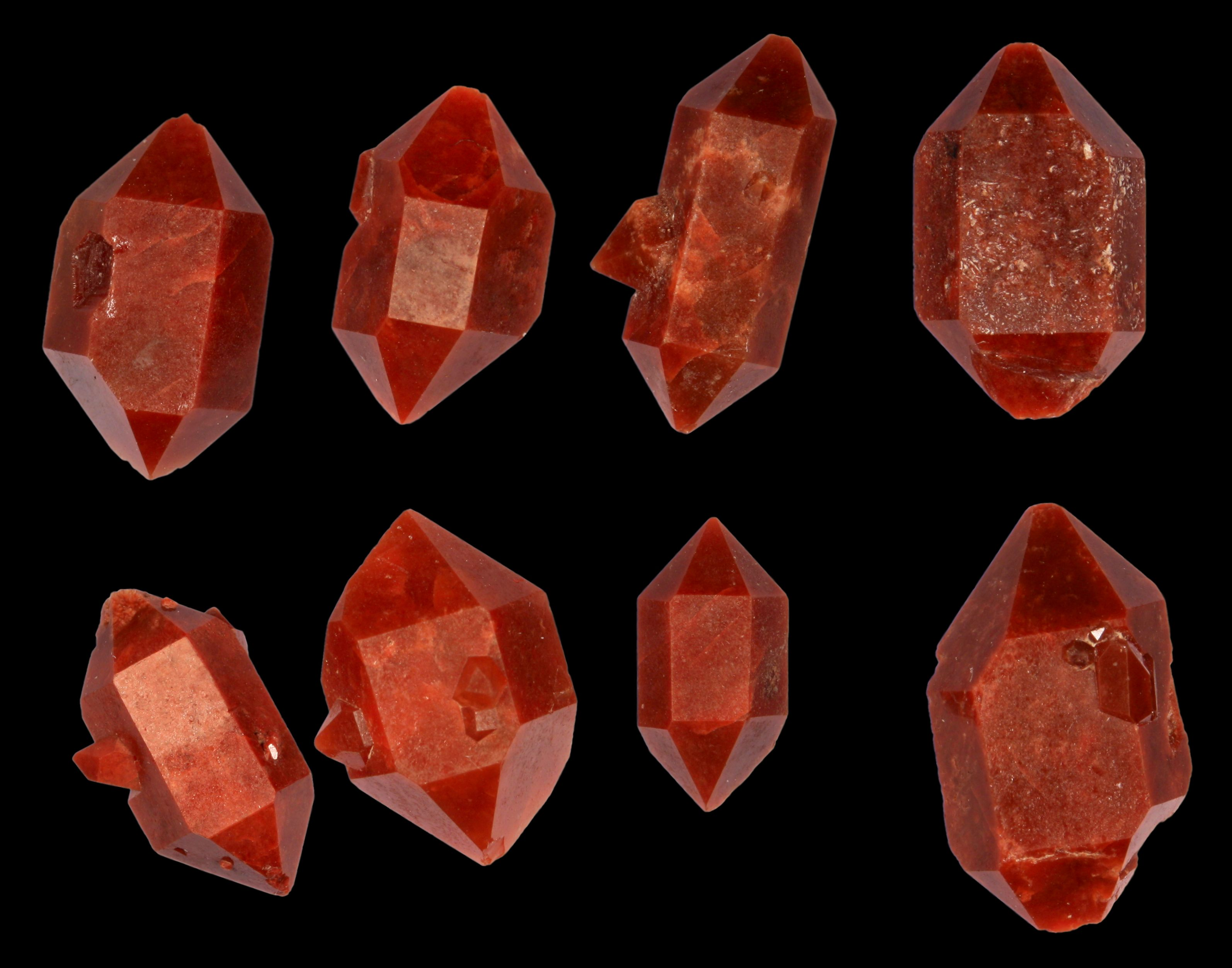
Common, prismatic quartz

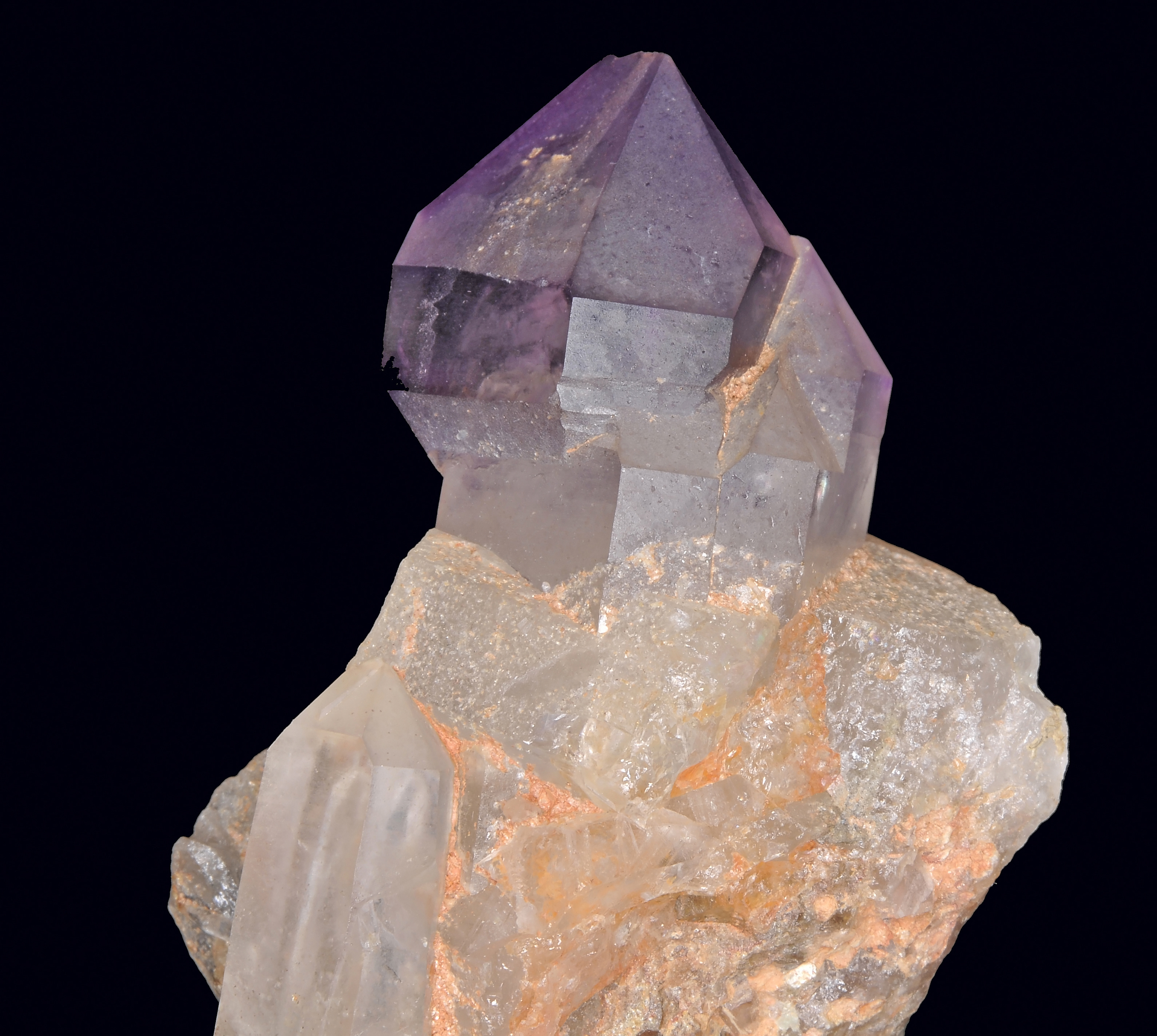
Sceptered quartz

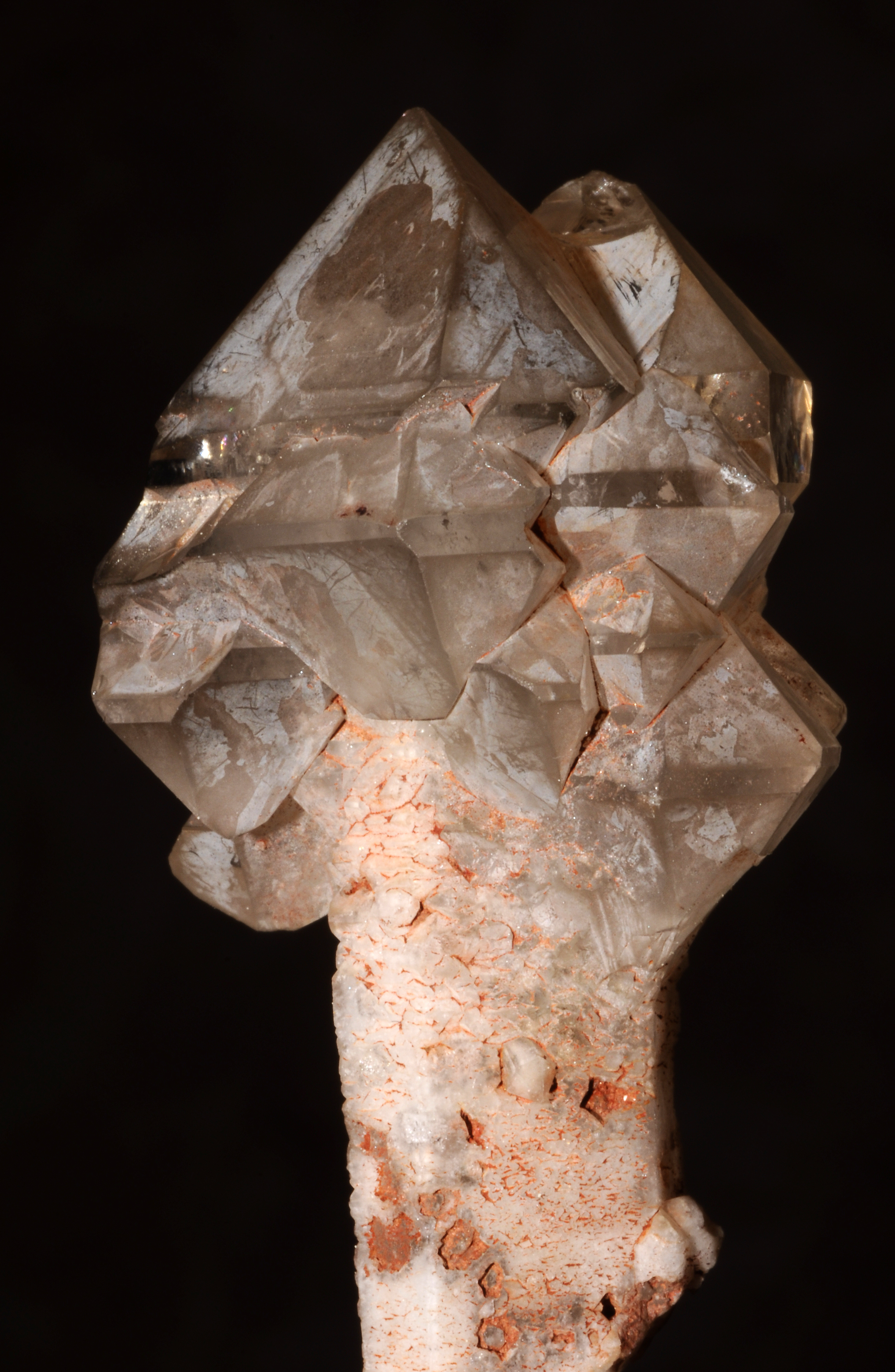
Sceptered quartz (as aggregates: "Elestial quartz")

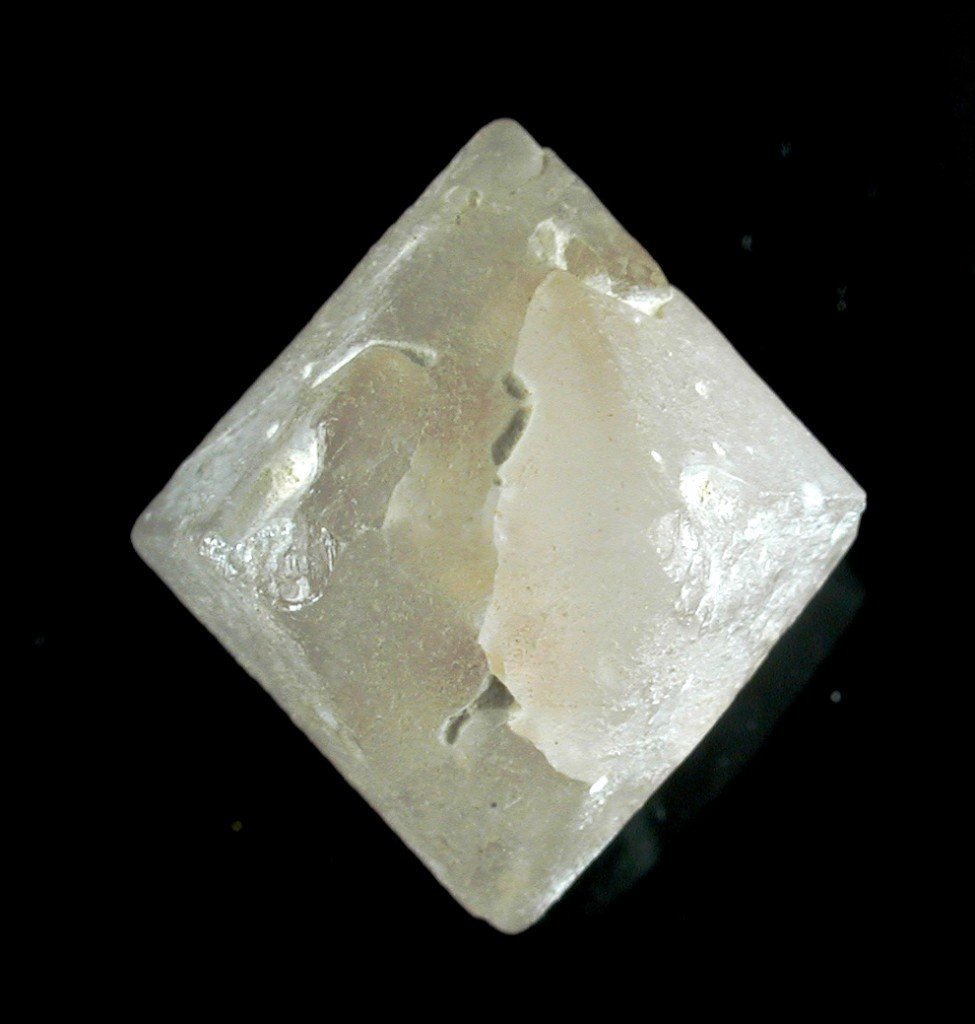
Bipyramidal quartz

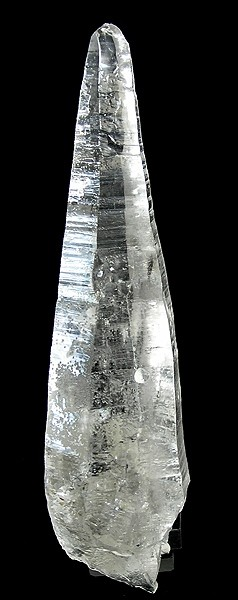
Tessin or tapered quartz

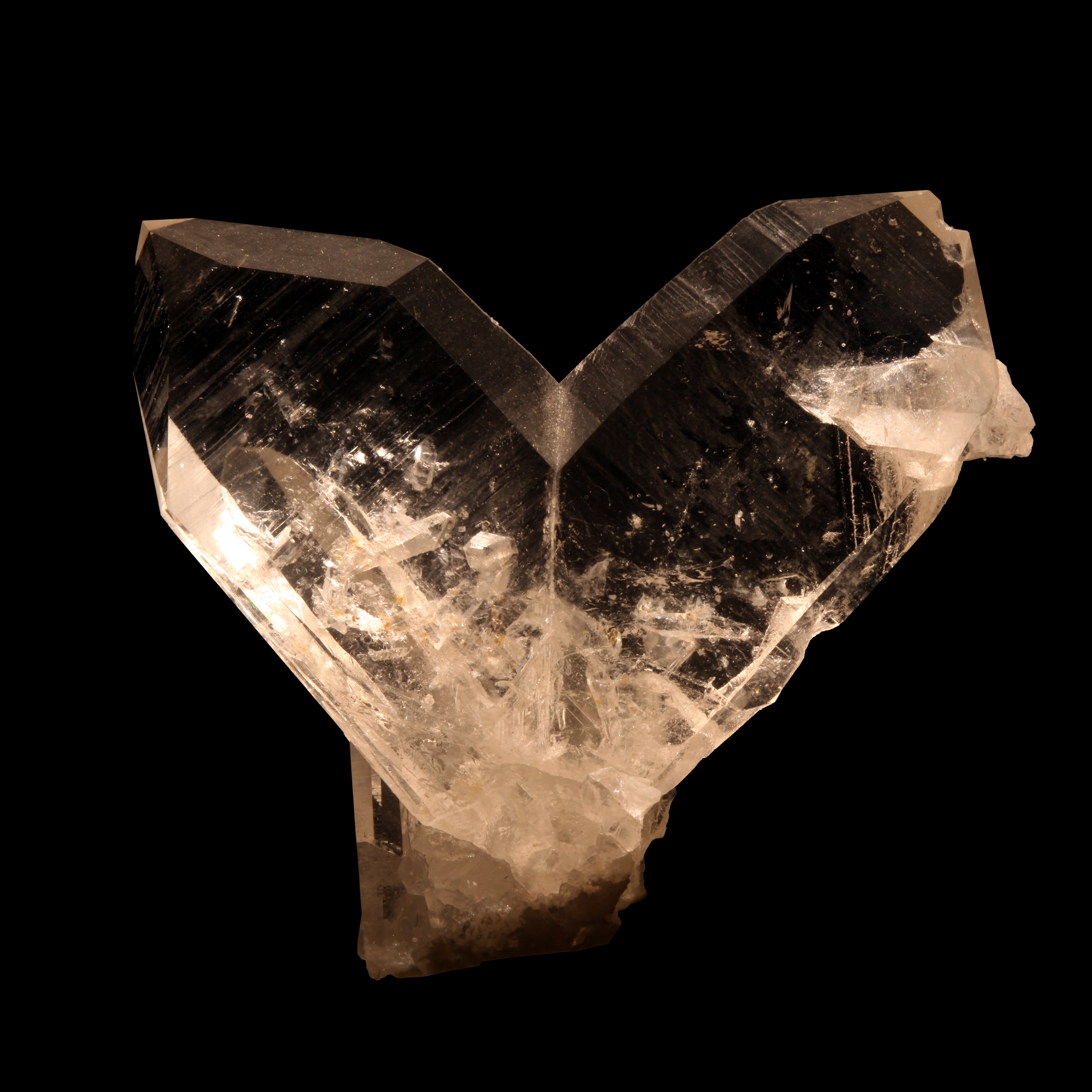
Twinned quartz (known as Japan law)

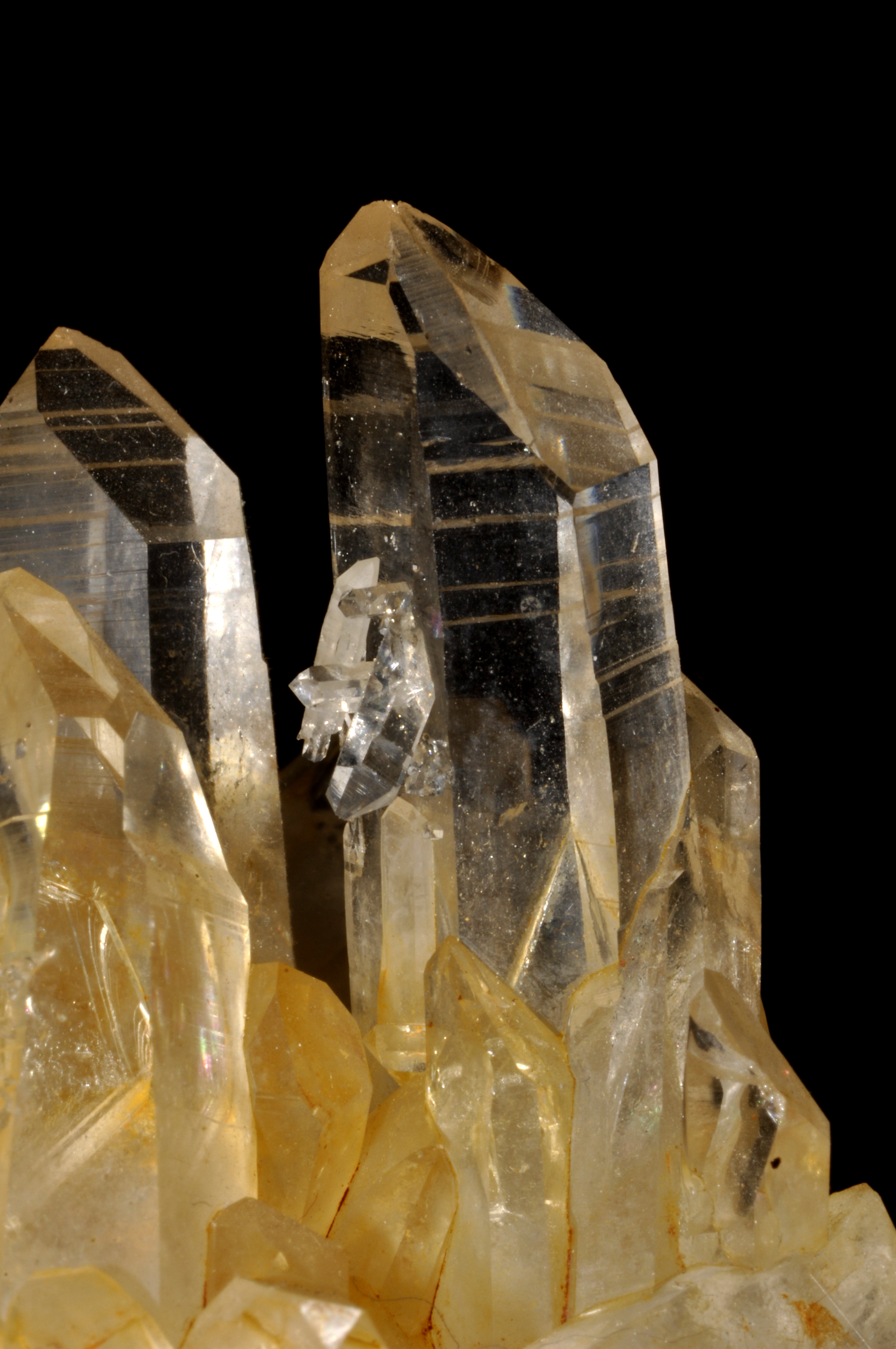
Dauphine quartz (single dominant face)

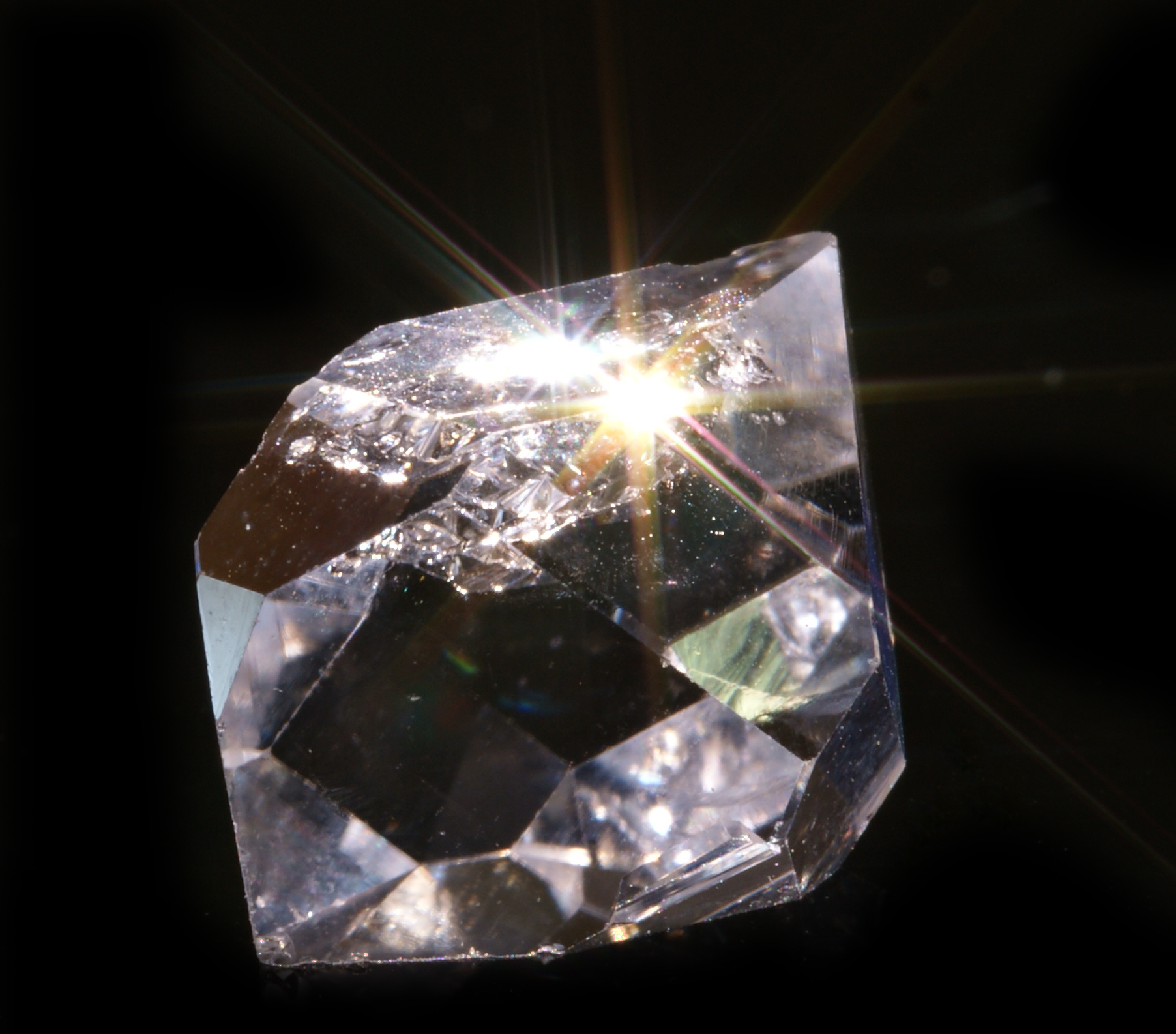
"Herkimer diamond"

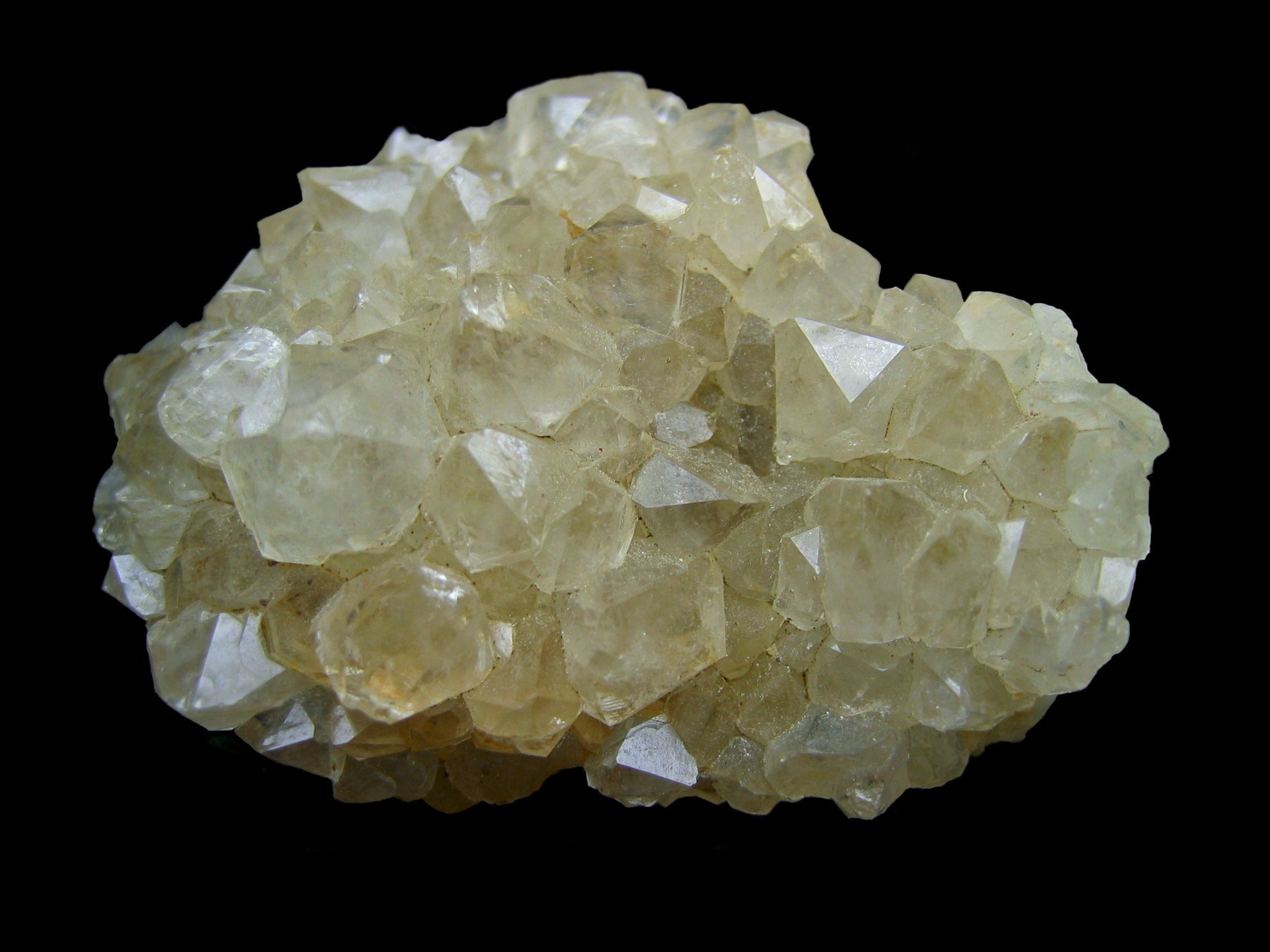
Druse quartz

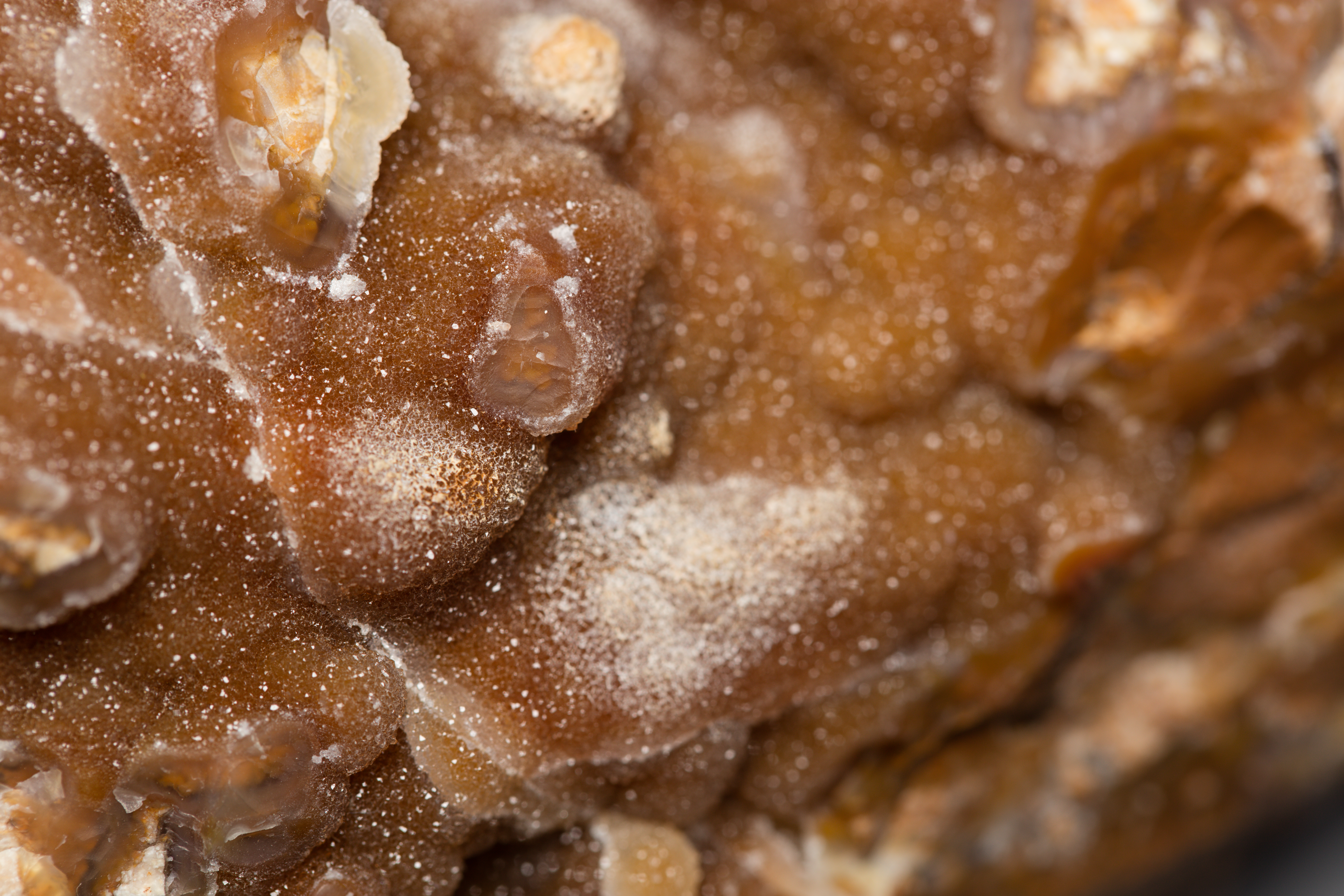
Granular quartz

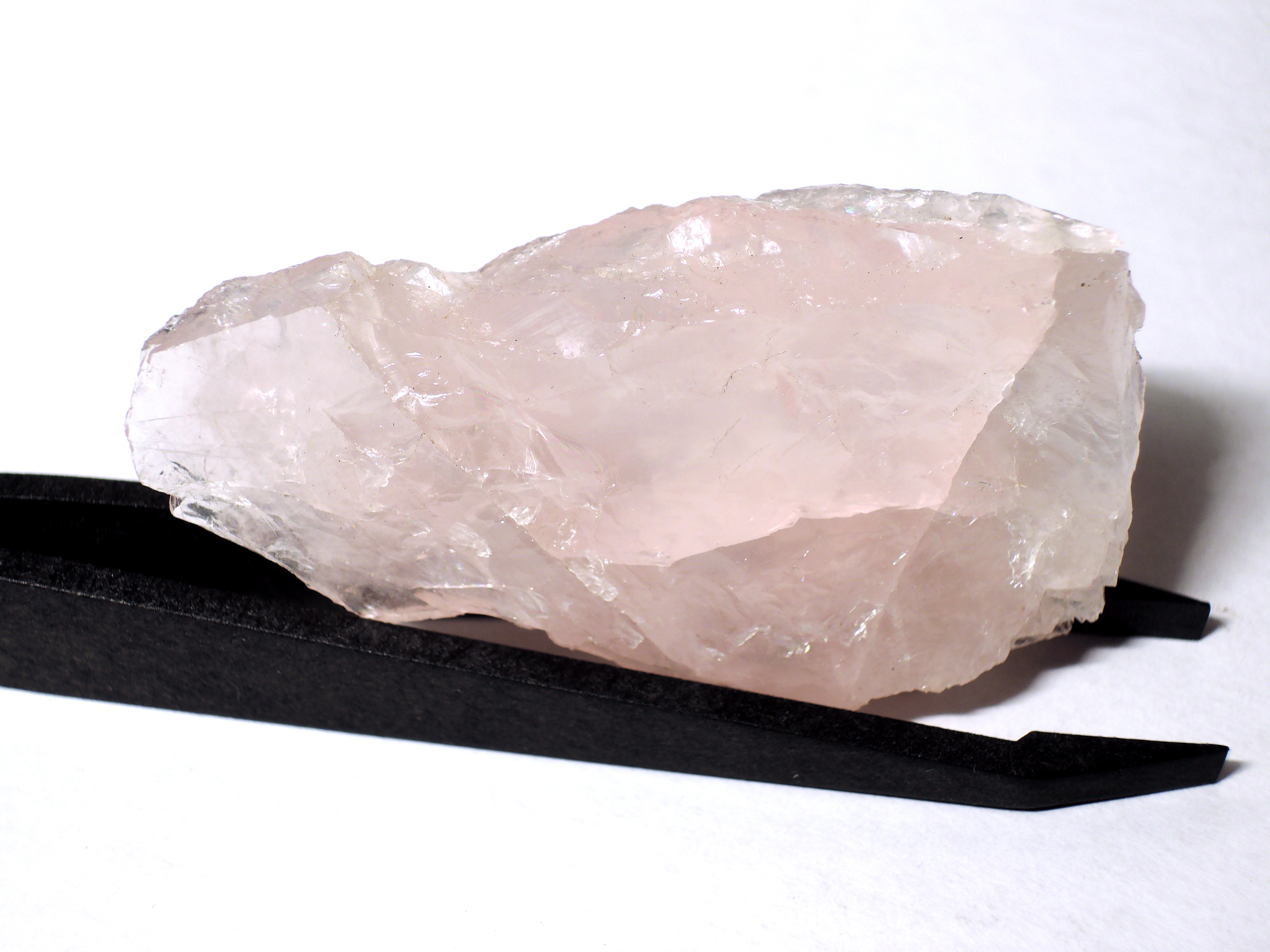
Massive quartz

== Varieties ==
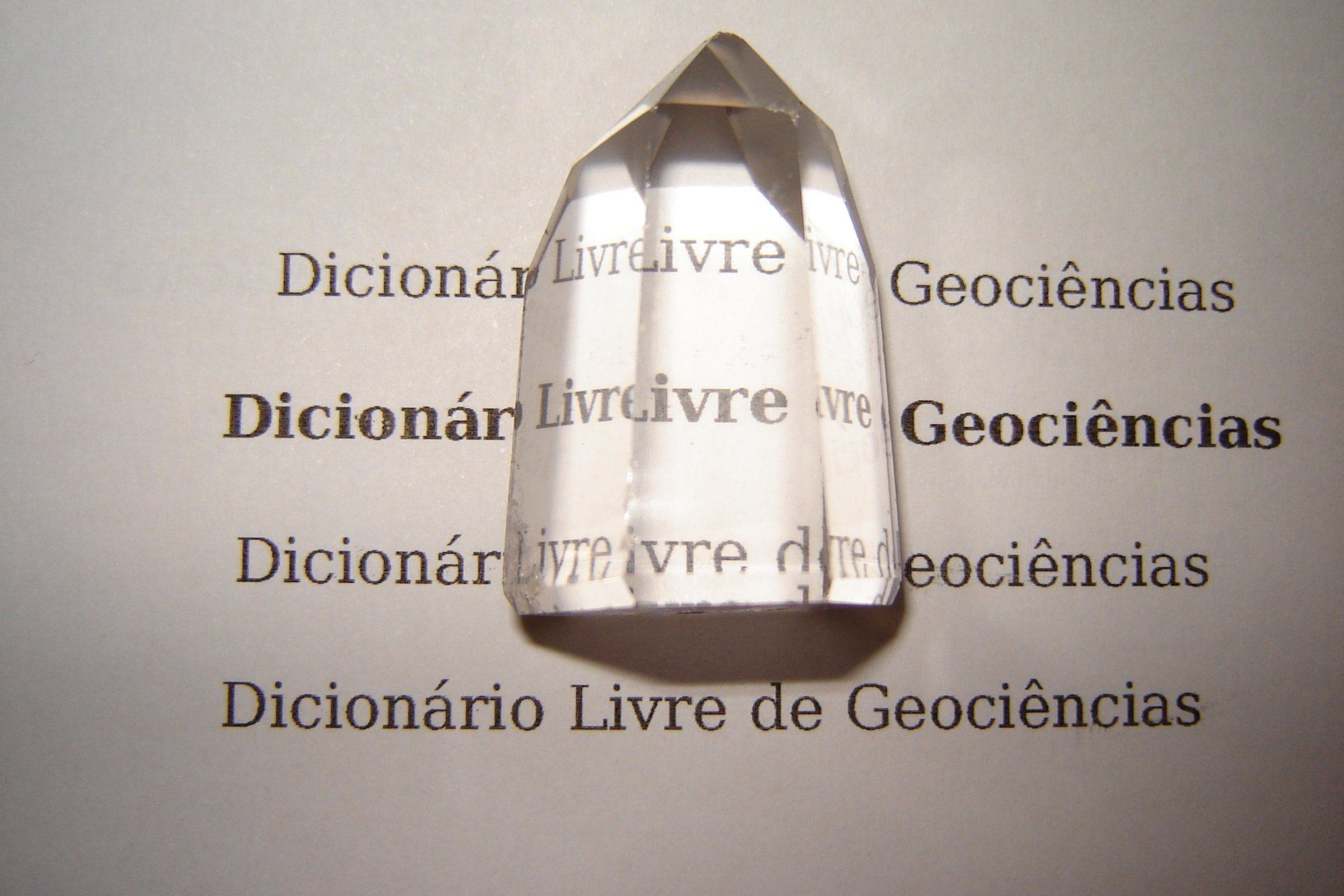
Clear quartz crystal demonstrating transparency

Pure quartz, traditionally called rock crystal or clear quartz, is colorless and transparent or translucent. Colored varieties of quartz are common and include citrine, rose quartz, amethyst, smoky quartz, milky quartz, and others. These color differentiations arise from the presence of impurities which change the molecular orbitals, causing some electronic transitions that absorb electromagnetic energy from the visible spectrum. The unabsorbed wavelengths are transmitted and give rise to the mineral's visible color.

Quartz varieties were previously classified into three categories based on the visibility of their individual crystals. Macrocrystalline quartz varieties have individual crystals that are visible to the unaided eye (macroscopic). Microcrystalline quartz varieties are aggregates of tiny crystals that can only be seen through a microscope (microscopic). Cryptocrystalline quartz varieties are aggregates of crystals that are too small to be seen even with an optical microscope (sub-microscopic). Today, the microcrystalline and cryptocrystalline varieties are commonly grouped together and referred to as chalcedony. However, in the scientific literature, chalcedony is a specific form of silica consisting of fine intergrowths of both quartz and its monoclinic polymorph, moganite. Chalcedony is commonly translucent to opaque, while the macrocrystalline varieties of quartz tend to be more transparent. Color is a secondary identifier for the cryptocrystalline varieties and a primary identifier for the macrocrystalline varieties.

Varieties of quartz
Name	Color	Cause	Description	Crystal visibility	Transparency	Major sources	Photo(s)	References
Agate	Frequently multicolored; commonly colorless, pale blue to black, red to orange, yellow, white, brown, pink, purple; rarely green	Varies by color	Banded variety of chalcedony	Cryptocrystalline, microcrystalline	Translucent to opaque	Widespread	Agate nodule from Malawi	
Amethyst	Purple to violet	Natural irradiation and trace impurities of iron (Fe^{3+})	Commonly occurs in large clusters and geodes	Macrocrystalline	Transparent	Brazil, Mexico, Uruguay, Russia, France, Namibia, Morocco	Amethyst cluster from Siberia	
Ametrine	Violet and yellow	Iron impurities	Commonly believed to be a combination of citrine and amethyst in the same crystal, although the yellow quartz component may not be true citrine. Most material sold as ametrine is partially heat-treated or artificially irradiated amethyst.	Macrocrystalline	Transparent to translucent	Bolivia, Brazil, India	Rough ametrine from Bolivia Cut ametrine	
Carnelian	Orange to red, red-brown	Iron oxide impurities	Variety of chalcedony. Natural carnelian is usually light in color; darker colors are produced by artificial heat treatment.	Cryptocrystalline, microcrystalline	Translucent to opaque	Peru, Sri Lanka	Natural carnelian from New Jersey, U.S. Carnelian cabochons	
Chalcedony	Almost any color	Varies by color	Fibrous form of silica composed mostly of quartz with some intergrown moganite (1-20%), occurs in many sub-varieties	Cryptocrystalline, microcrystalline	Transparent to opaque	Widespread	Chalcedony from Czech Republic	
Citrine	Natural: yellow to yellow-green or yellow-orange, often with smoky hues Heat-treated amethyst: yellow-orange, orange, red, brown	Natural: no scientific consensus (either aluminum color centers or trace iron impurities) Heat-treated amethyst: trace amounts of iron oxides (hematite and goethite)	Natural citrine is rare; most material sold as citrine is heat-treated amethyst or sometimes heat-treated smoky quartz. Quartz colored yellow from stains, coatings, or inclusions is generally not considered citrine.	Macrocrystalline	Transparent	Brazil	Twinned natural citrine crystals from Russia "Citrine" (heat-treated amethyst) geode	
Cotterite	Silvery metallic sheen	Develops in very thin layers with extremely thin cracks that produce a light-scattering effect giving cotterite a pearly metallic luster	Extremely rare. Derived from a single vein of calcite, quartz and ferruginous mud in Carboniferous Limestone in Rockforest, County Cork, Ireland	Macrocrystalline	Opaque	Ireland	Cotterite from Ireland	
Dumortierite quartz	Blue, shades of purple and gray	Mineral inclusions	Contains silky inclusions of blue dumortierite	Macrocrystalline	Translucent		Dumortierite quartz from Brazil	
Jasper	Typically red to brown; may have other colors		Impure variety of chalcedony	Microcrystalline	Opaque		Red jasper from Japan	
Milky quartz	White	Minute fluid inclusions of gas, liquid, or both, trapped during crystal formation	Less desirable as a gemstone	Macrocrystalline	Translucent to opaque		Milky quartz from Colorado, USA	
Onyx	Black and white, monochromatic	Carbon impurities	Variety of agate	Cryptocrystalline, microcrystalline	Semi-translucent to opaque		Onyx from Germany	
Prase	Leek green	Inclusions of the amphibole mineral actinolite	As originally defined in Germany. The name prase has also been used historically for similarly-colored quartzite and jasper, and today it may refer to any leek-green quartz.	Macrocrystalline			Prase from Tuscany, Italy	
Prasiolite (vermarine, green amethyst)	Green	Trace Fe^{2+} compounds	Rare. Most material sold as prasiolite is produced by heating amethyst.	Macrocrystalline	Transparent	Brazil; Thunder Bay, Canada; Poland	Cut prasiolite from Brazil	
Rock crystal (clear quartz)	Colorless	Absence of impurities		Macrocrystalline	Transparent to translucent		Clear quartz crystals	
Rose quartz	Pale pink to rose	Microscopic inclusions of a fibrous mineral related to dumortierite Euhedral rose quartz: aluminum and phosphorus color centers	Rose quartz is always massive and anhedral. However, a distinct variety called euhedral rose quartz or pink quartz occurs as well-formed hexagonal crystals.	Macrocrystalline	Translucent Euhedral rose quartz: transparent		Rose quartz Euhedral rose quartz (pink quartz) cluster from Minas Gerais, Brazil	
Rutilated quartz	Clear with golden-yellow or black inclusions	Mineral inclusions	Contains acicular (needle-like) inclusions of rutile	Macrocrystalline	Transparent to translucent		Rutilated quartz cluster from Brazil	
Smoky quartz	Light to dark gray, brown, black	Color centers around aluminum impurities activated by natural irradiation		Macrocrystalline	Translucent to opaque		Smoky quartz from Brazil	
Tiger's eye	Gold, red-brown, blue		Exhibits chatoyancy	Macrocrystalline	Opaque		Rough tiger's eye Polished red tiger's eye	

== Piezoelectricity ==
Quartz crystals have piezoelectric properties; they develop an electric potential upon the application of mechanical stress. Quartz's piezoelectric properties were discovered by Jacques and Pierre Curie in 1880.

== Occurrence ==
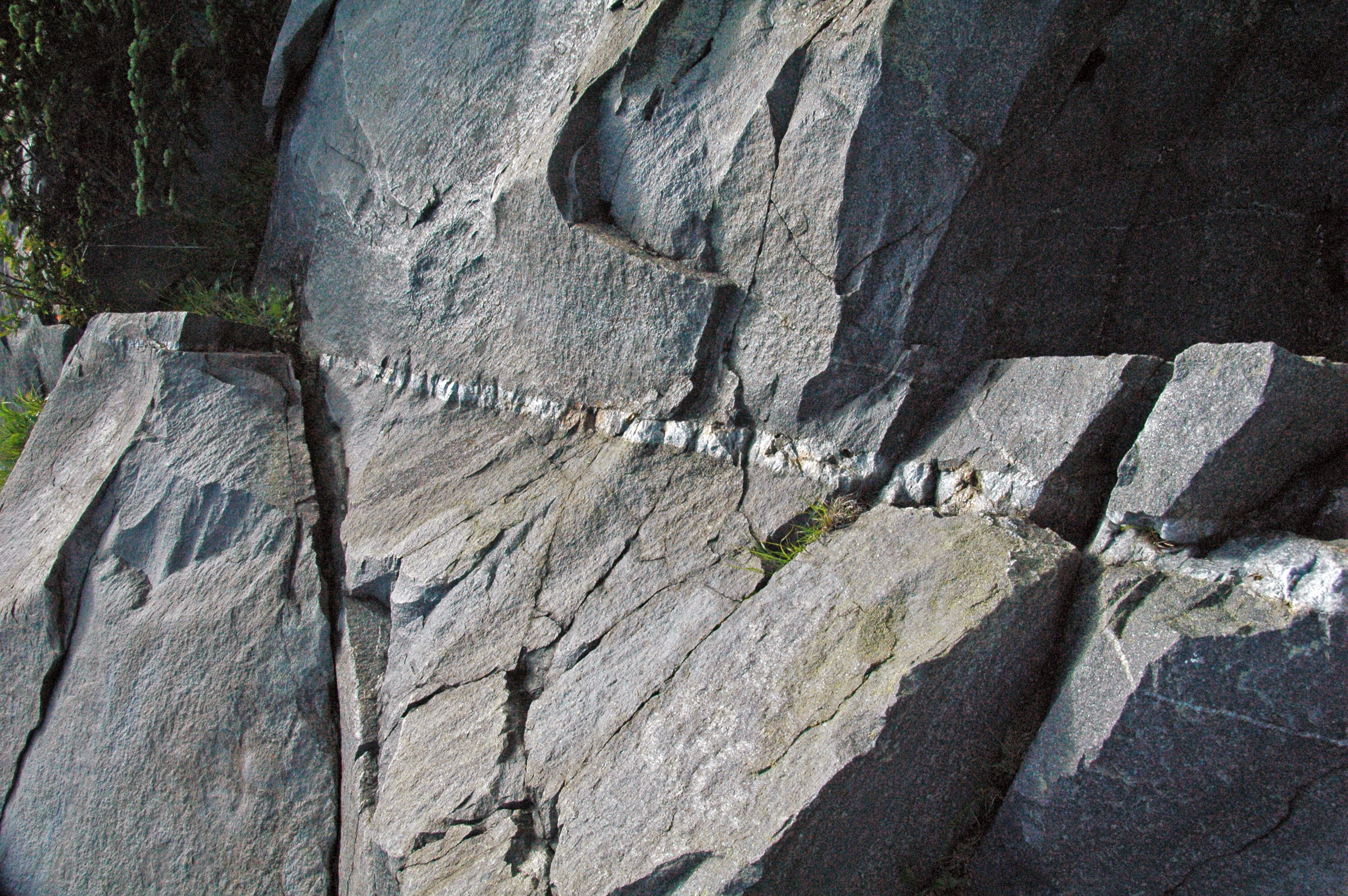
Quartz vein in sandstone, North Carolina

Quartz is the second most abundant mineral or mineral group in the Earth's lithosphere; by mass, the feldspar group comprises 41% of the lithosphere, followed by quartz at 12% and the pyroxene group at 11%. Quartz is a defining constituent of granite and other felsic igneous rocks. It is very common in sedimentary rocks such as sandstone and shale. It is a common constituent of schist, gneiss, quartzite and other metamorphic rocks. Quartz has the lowest potential for weathering in the Goldich dissolution series and consequently it is very common as a residual mineral in stream sediments and residual soils. Generally a high presence of quartz suggests a "mature" rock, since it indicates the rock has been heavily reworked and quartz was the primary mineral that endured heavy weathering.

While the majority of quartz crystallizes from molten magma, quartz also chemically precipitates from hot hydrothermal veins as gangue, sometimes with ore minerals such as gold, silver and copper. Large crystals of quartz are found in magmatic pegmatites. Well-formed crystals may reach several meters in length and weigh hundreds of kilograms.

The largest documented single crystal of quartz was found near Itapore, Goiaz, Brazil; it measured approximately 6.1 m × 1.5 m × 1.5 m (20 ft × 5 ft × 5 ft) and weighed over 39,900 kg (88,000 lb).

== Mining ==
Quartz is extracted from open-pit mines. Miners occasionally use explosives to expose deep pockets of quartz. More frequently, bulldozers and backhoes are used to remove soil and clay and expose quartz veins, which are then worked using hand tools. Care must be taken to avoid sudden temperature changes that may damage the crystals.

== Related silica minerals ==
Pressure-temperature diagram showing the stability ranges for the two forms of quartz and some other forms of silica

Tridymite and cristobalite are high-temperature polymorphs of SiO_{2} that occur in high-silica volcanic rocks. Coesite is a denser polymorph of SiO_{2} found in some meteorite impact sites and in metamorphic rocks formed at pressures greater than those typical of the Earth's crust. Stishovite is a yet denser and higher-pressure polymorph of SiO_{2} found in some meteorite impact sites. Moganite is a monoclinic polymorph. Lechatelierite is an amorphous silica glass SiO_{2} which is formed by lightning strikes in quartz sand.

== Safety ==
As quartz is a form of silica, it is a possible cause for concern in various workplaces. Cutting, grinding, chipping, sanding, drilling, and polishing natural and manufactured stone products can release hazardous levels of very small, crystalline silica dust particles into the air that workers breathe. Crystalline silica of respirable size is a recognized human carcinogen and may lead to other diseases of the lungs such as silicosis and pulmonary fibrosis.

== Synthetic and artificial treatments ==
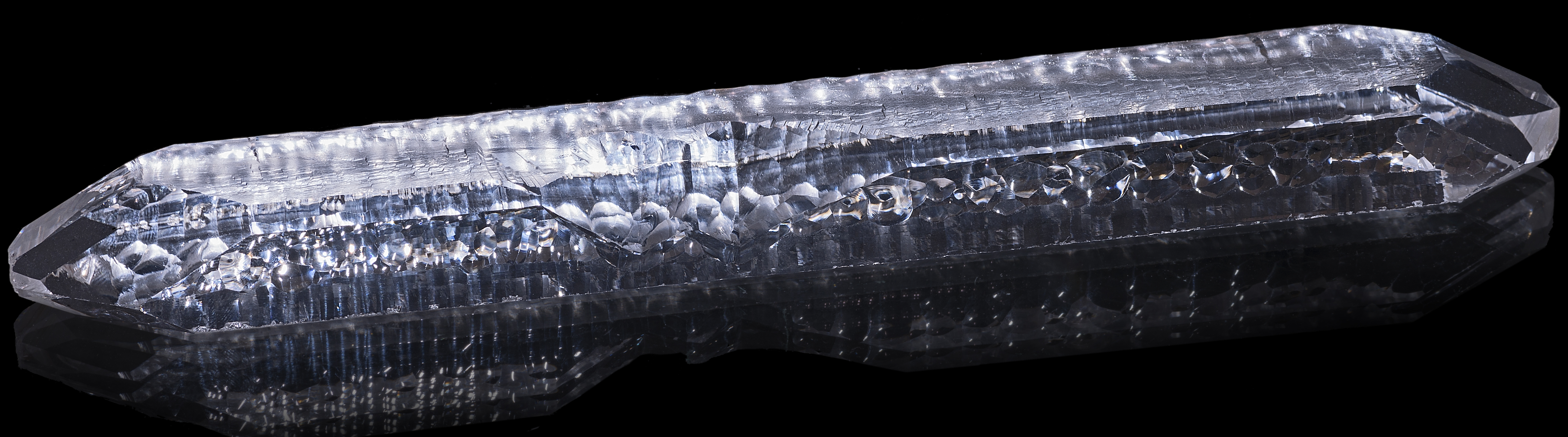
A synthetic quartz crystal grown by the hydrothermal method, about 19 centimetres (7.5 in) long and weighing about 127 grams (4.5 oz)

Not all varieties of quartz are naturally occurring. Some clear quartz crystals can be treated using heat or gamma irradiation to induce color where it would not otherwise have occurred naturally. Susceptibility to such treatments depends on the location from which the quartz was mined. Prasiolite, an olive-colored material, is produced by heat treatment; natural prasiolite has also been observed in Lower Silesia in Poland. Although citrine occurs naturally, the majority is the result of heat-treating amethyst or smoky quartz. Carnelian has been heat-treated to deepen its color since prehistoric times. Because natural quartz is often twinned, synthetic quartz is produced for use in industry. Large, flawless single crystals are synthesized in an autoclave via the hydrothermal process. Like other crystals, quartz may be coated with metal vapors to give it an attractive sheen.

== Uses ==
Quartz is the most common material identified as the mystical substance maban in Australian Aboriginal mythology. It is found regularly in passage tomb cemeteries in Europe in a burial context, such as Newgrange or Carrowmore in Ireland. Quartz was also used in prehistoric Ireland, as well as many other countries, for stone tools; both vein quartz and rock crystal were knapped as part of the lithic technology of prehistoric peoples.

While jade has been the most prized semi-precious stone for carving in East Asia and pre-Columbian America since earliest times, in Europe and the Middle East different varieties of quartz were the most commonly used for the various types of jewelry and hardstone carving, including engraved gems and cameo gems, rock crystal vases, and extravagant vessels. The tradition continued to produce highly valued objects until the mid-19th century, when it largely fell from fashion except in jewelry. Cameo technique exploits the bands of color in onyx and other varieties.

Efforts to synthesize quartz began in the mid-19th century as scientists attempted to create minerals under laboratory conditions that mimicked the conditions in which the minerals formed in nature. German geologist Karl Emil von Schafhäutl (1803–1890) was the first person to synthesize quartz when in 1845 he created microscopic quartz crystals in a pressure cooker. However, the quality and size of the crystals that were produced by these early efforts were poor.

Elemental impurity incorporation strongly influences the ability to process and utilize quartz. Naturally occurring quartz crystals of extremely high purity, necessary for the crucibles and other equipment used for growing perfect large silicon boules to be sliced into silicon wafers in the semiconductor industry, are expensive and rare. These high-purity quartzes are defined as containing less than 50 ppm of impurity elements. A major mining location for high-purity quartz is the Spruce Pine Mining District in Spruce Pine, North Carolina, United States. Quartz may also be found in Caldoveiro Peak in Asturias, Spain.

By the 1930s, the electronics industry had become dependent on quartz crystals. The only source of suitable crystals was Brazil; however, World War II disrupted supplies from Brazil, so nations attempted to synthesize quartz on a commercial scale. German mineralogist Richard Nacken (1884–1971) achieved some success during the 1930s and 1940s. After the war, many laboratories attempted to grow large quartz crystals. In the United States, the U.S. Army Signal Corps contracted with Bell Laboratories and with the Brush Development Company of Cleveland, Ohio to synthesize crystals following Nacken's lead. (Prior to World War II, Brush Development produced piezoelectric crystals for record players.) By 1948, Brush Development had grown crystals that were 1.5 inches (3.8 cm) in diameter, the largest at that time. By the 1950s, hydrothermal synthesis techniques were producing synthetic quartz crystals on an industrial scale, and today virtually all the quartz crystal used in the modern electronics industry is synthetic.

An early use of the piezoelectricity of quartz crystals was in phonograph pickups. One of the most common piezoelectric uses of quartz today is as a crystal oscillator. Also called a quartz oscillator or resonator, it was first developed by Walter Guyton Cady in 1921. George Washington Pierce designed and patented quartz crystal oscillators in 1923. The quartz clock is a familiar device using the mineral; it is simply a clock that uses a quartz oscillator as its time reference. Warren Marrison created the first quartz oscillator clock based on the work of Cady and Pierce in 1927. The resonant frequency of a quartz crystal oscillator is changed by mechanically loading it, and this principle is used for very accurate measurements of very small mass changes in the quartz crystal microbalance and in thin-film thickness monitors.

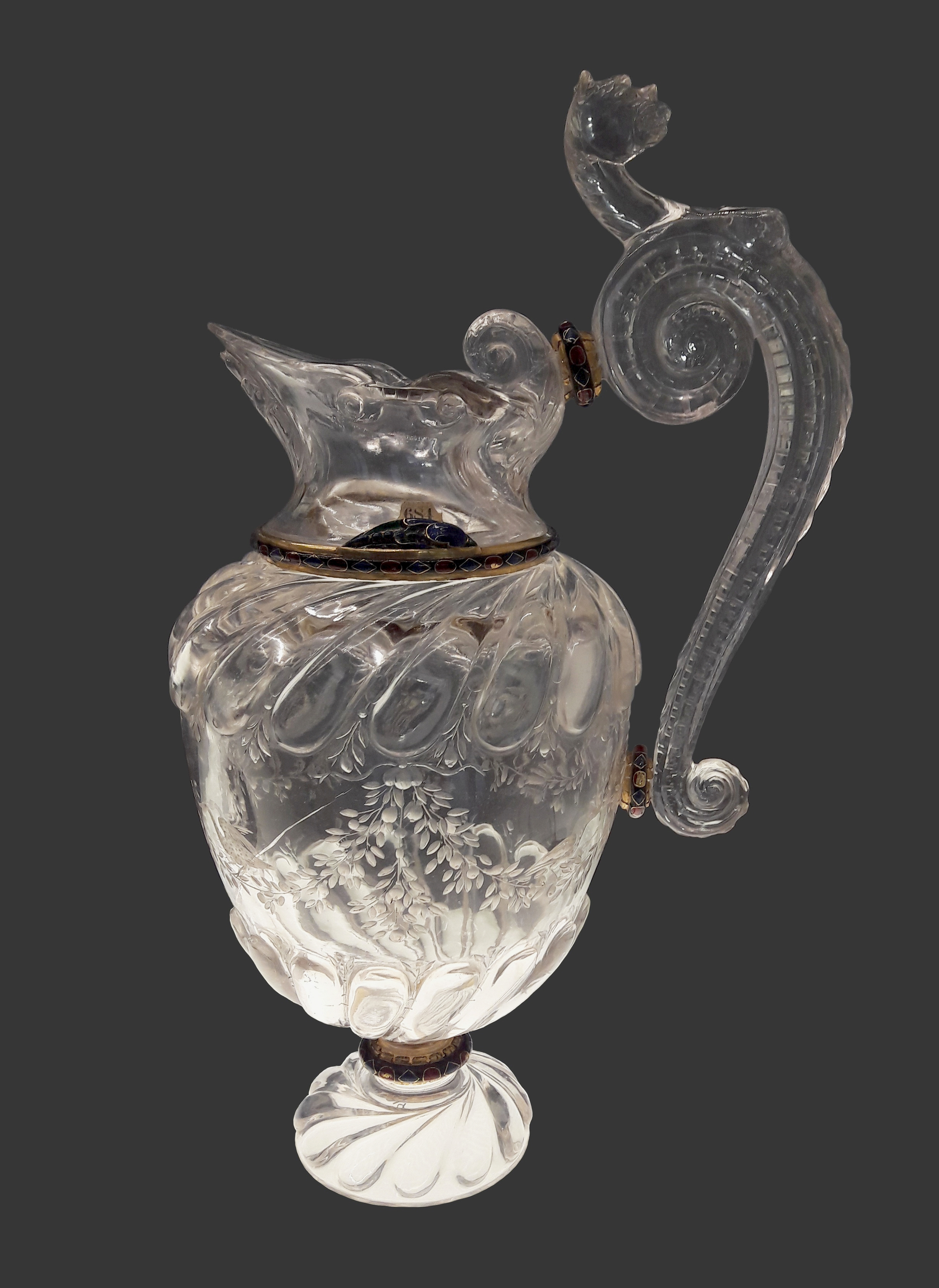
Rock crystal jug with cut festoon decoration by a Milan workshop from the second half of the 16th century, National Museum, Warsaw. Milan, apart from Prague and Florence, was the main Renaissance centre for crystal cutting.

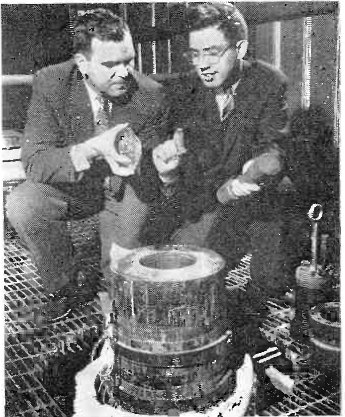
Synthetic quartz crystals produced in the autoclave shown in Western Electric's pilot hydrothermal quartz plant in 1959

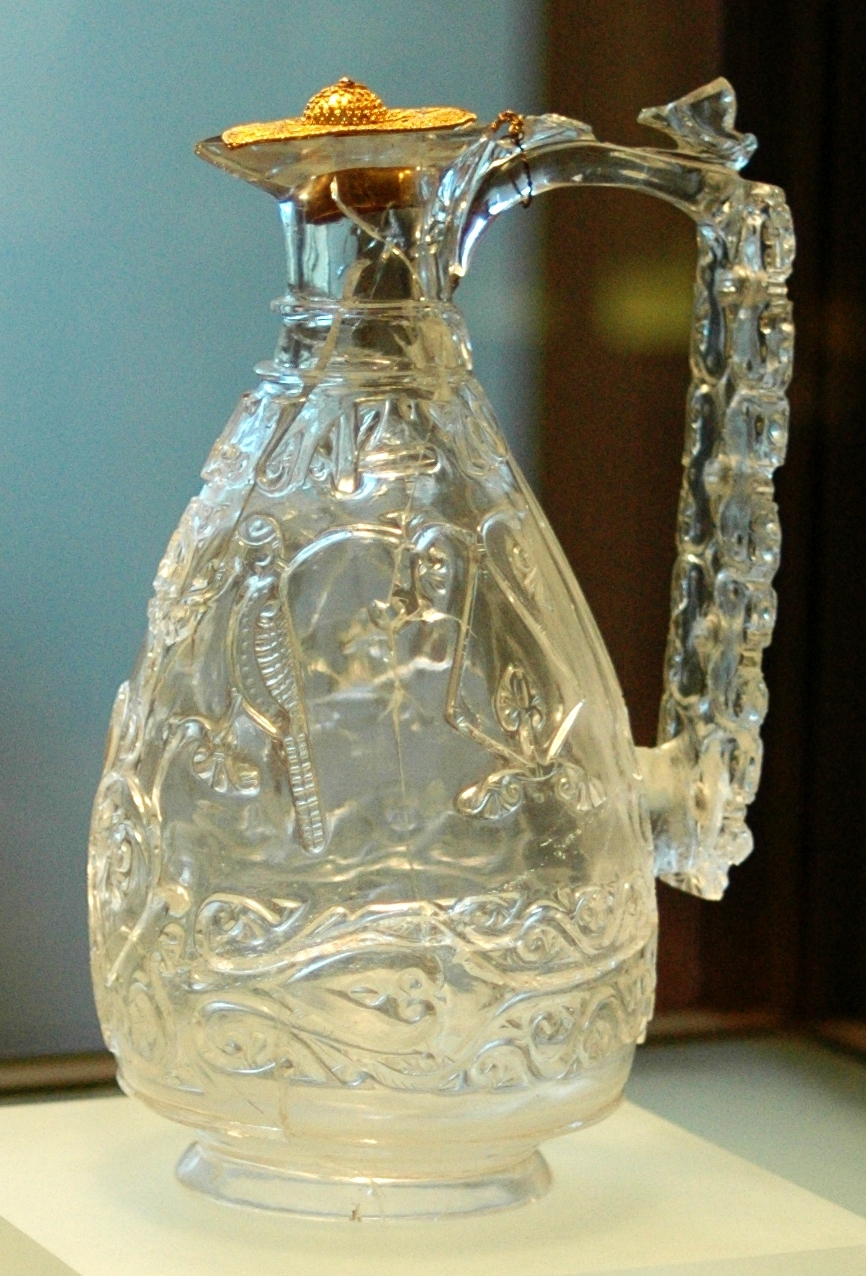
Fatimid ewer in carved rock crystal (clear quartz) with gold lid, c. 1000

Almost all the industrial demand for quartz crystal (used primarily in electronics) is met with synthetic quartz produced by the hydrothermal process. However, synthetic crystals are less prized for use as gemstones. The popularity of crystal healing has increased the demand for natural quartz crystals, which are now often mined in developing countries using primitive mining methods, sometimes involving child labor.

== See also ==
- Fused quartz
- List of minerals
- Quartz fiber
- Quartz reef mining
- Quartzolite
- Shocked quartz
