= Queen of Asia (gem) =

World's largest Blue Sapphire

- Type of stone: Sapphire
- Weight: 310 kilograms (1,600,000 carats)
- Color: Blue
- Cut: Rough
- Country of origin: Sri Lanka

Queen of Asia is the world's largest natural corundum blue sapphire. It weighs 310 kilograms (1,600,000 carats).

== See also ==
- List of individual gemstones
- Serendipity Sapphire, largest star sapphire cluster in the world
- Star of Adam, largest star sapphire in the world
