= James J. Hill Sapphire =

- Type of stone: Sapphire
- Weight: ca. 22.66 carats (4.532 g)
- Color: Blue (exact colour grade unknown)
- Country of origin: India
- Estimated value: https://encrypted-tbn0.gstatic.com/images?q=tbn:ANd9GcSgAwEQmPOCmiDumpp5UD6n2tC1SH3gx7gG7xDLZojzQbSv8P-agHkh8Fowpc1xxtg992tqZI7yO_XrQmIKxhHRzRqEWQeuvtZ6CKE6RZz1cA&s=10

The unnamed Kashmir sapphire is a 22.66 carat (4.532 g) gem. It is known for its former owner, railroad executive James J. Hill, who purchased it in 1886 for his wife as part of a diamond- and sapphire-adorned necklace. It was eventually split off and given to one of their children. It was later donated to the Minnesota Historical Society, who sold it at auction at Christie's for $3,064,000, ahead of expectations. It is currently the world's most valuable known sapphire.

== Characteristics ==
The Kashmir sapphire weighs 22.66 carats (4.532 g). It has a "cornflower color with a velvety texture" and has a "very high degree of transparency." It is set within a European-cut diamond surround and mounted in gold.

== History ==
The sapphire was originally a part of a $2,200 diamond- and sapphire-adorned necklace. It was owned by a vendor identified as Randel, Baremore Billings until it was purchased by James J. Hill in 1886. James then gave the sapphire as a gift to his wife, Mary Hill that same year. Three years after Hill's death in 1916, the necklace was split between Hill's six daughters, dividing the central stone and 36 smaller gems between them. The sapphire first entered the possession of Gertrude Gavin before she gave it to her sister, Rachel Boeckmann. It later entered the possession of Gertrude Ffolliett, granddaughter of Mary Hill.

=== Sale ===
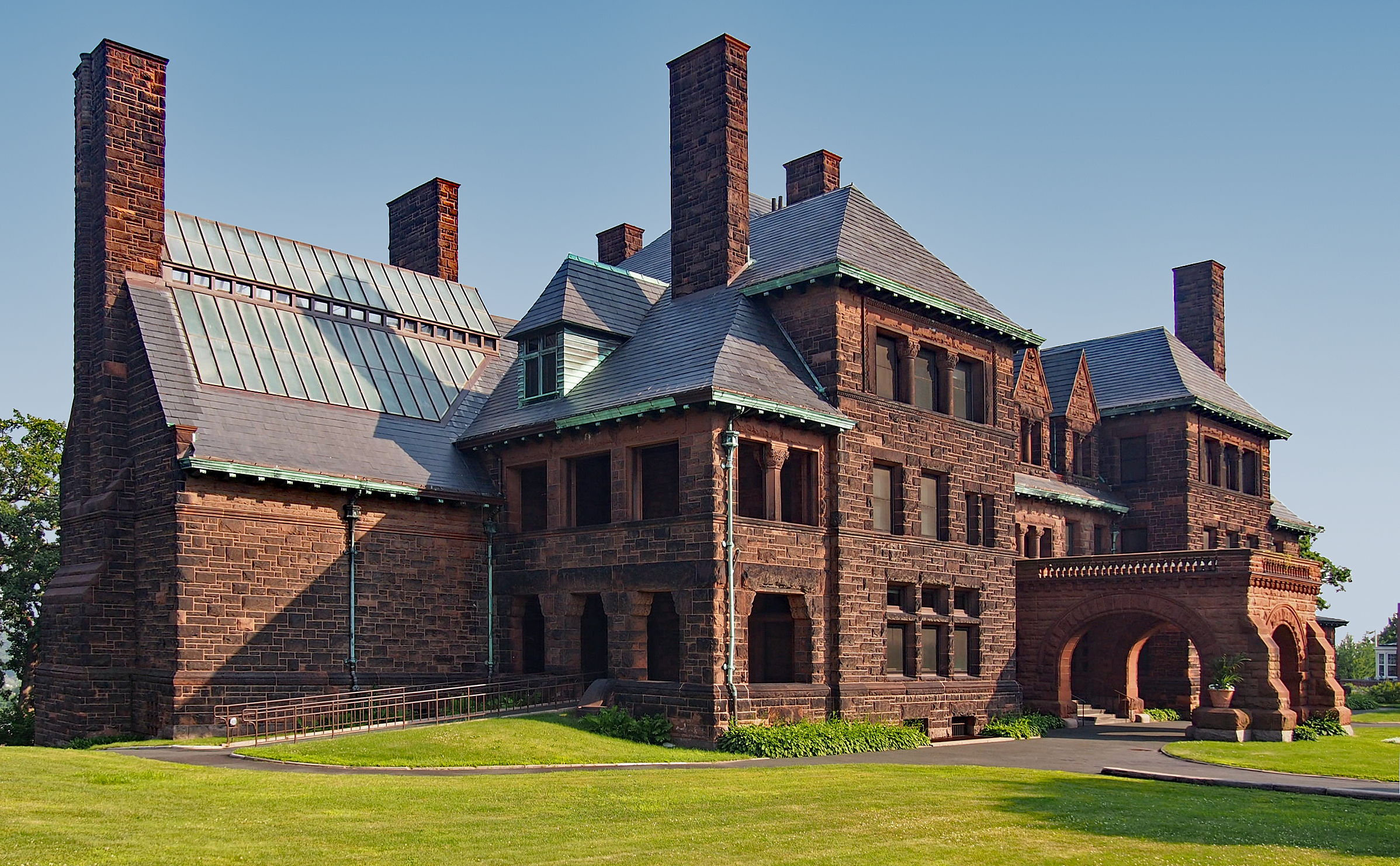
James J. Hill House

When Gertrude died in 2005, she included in her will that the sapphire would be given to Friends of the James J. Hill House with the authorization to sell it. It was not entered into the society's collection or put on display due to the feeling that because the necklace was split up, it did not have the historical significance that it would have if it was part of the necklace. It was sought to be sold, and initial expectations of the price of the sapphire was approximately $80,000 to $90,000, though it was later upgraded to $250,000 to $350,000 when the Minnesota Historical Society, the administers of the James J. Hill House turned it over to Christie's New York. This later estimate was acknowledged by insiders as a "low-ball estimate," however. The sapphire's value was later upped by Rahul Kadakia, senior vice president and head of jewelry at Christie's America, to approximately $1 million.

It was sold as Lot No. 261, and the auctioneer was François Curiel. Its catalogue copy read "one of the most important sapphires currently on the market and is unsurpassed in richness and life," which author Stephen G. Bloom described as "expected hyperbole." Bidding for the sapphire began at $1 million, and through multiple bids it rose over 90 seconds to $2 million. Two men eventually entered a bidding war, where they each were raising the bid by $100,000 increments every 20 seconds. The bidding had slowed at $2.5 million, with an eventual attempt by one to raise it to $2.6 million, only for him to be outbid at $2.7 million and the bidding to end. It ultimately sold for $3,064,000 to an anonymous bidder, exceeding the previous record for a sapphire purchase in 2001 by $24,000.

In total, the Minnesota Historical Society received $2.6 million from the sale. Kadakia claimed that the sale was "the perfect auction situation" due to its family history, age, its unknown status, and the cause it was going towards. He also called it "one of the finest Kashmir sapphires [he had] seen." The money was put towards the maintenance of the James J. Hill House.

== See also ==
- List of individual gemstones
- List of sapphires by size
