= Hall Sapphire and Diamond Necklace =

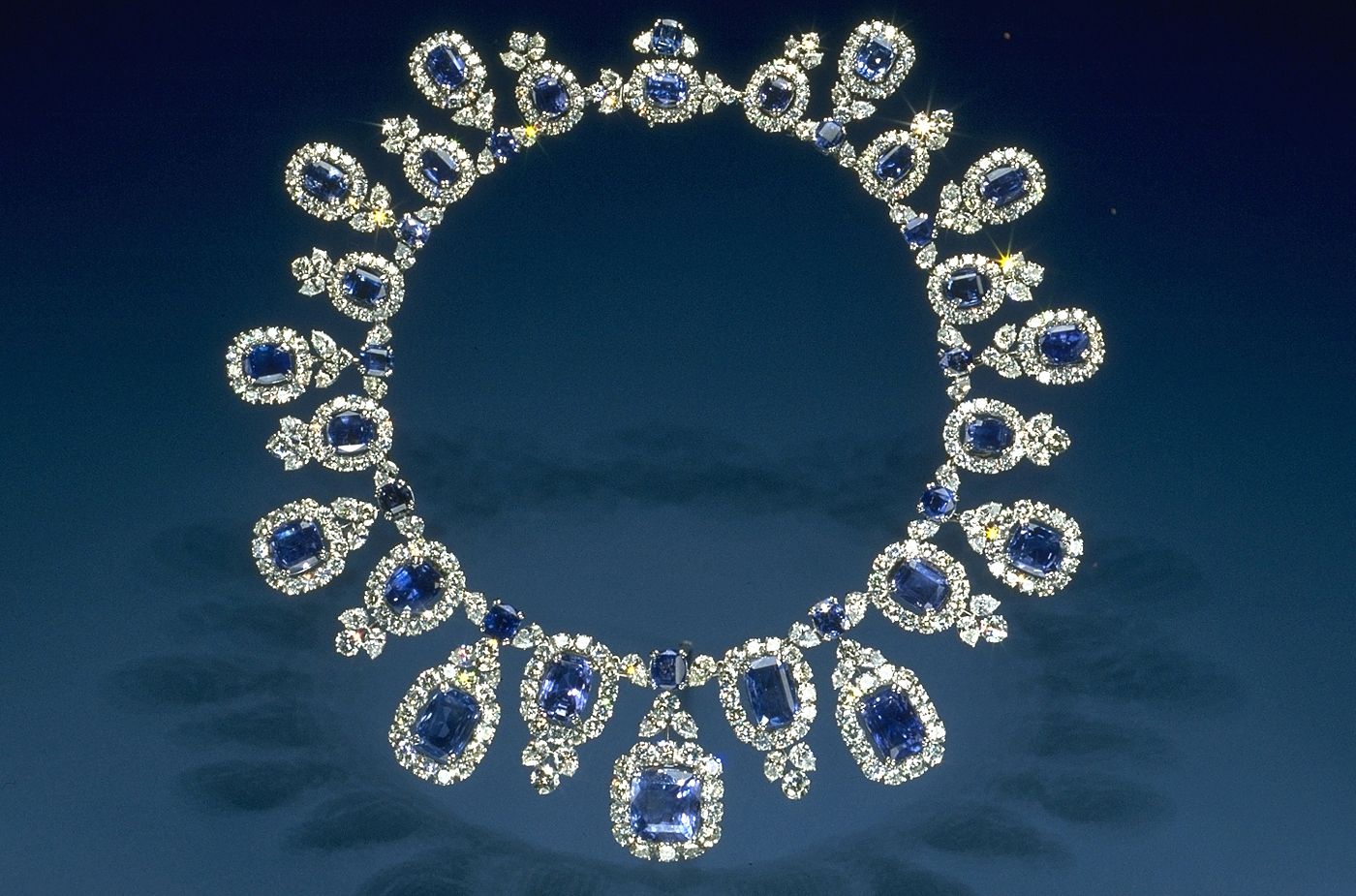
The Hall Sapphire and Diamond Necklace, National Museum of Natural History, Washington DC

The Hall Sapphire and Diamond Necklace has 36 matched sapphires from Sri Lanka which total 195 carats. These sapphires are surrounded by 435 brilliant-cut diamonds that total 83.75 carats. The sapphires are cushion-cut, some of the diamonds are pear-shaped and the others are round cut. The setting is platinum.

It was designed by Harry Winston, Inc. It is currently on display at the National Museum of Natural History, part of the Smithsonian Institution, in Washington, D.C., alongside the Bismarck Sapphire Necklace and the Logan sapphire. It was donated to the Smithsonian by Mrs. Evelyn Annenberg Hall (c. 1912 – April 21, 2005) in 1979. She was the sister of Walter Annenberg, publisher, businessman, and philanthropist.

== See also ==
- Yogo sapphire
