= Bismarck Sapphire Necklace =

Sapphire necklace

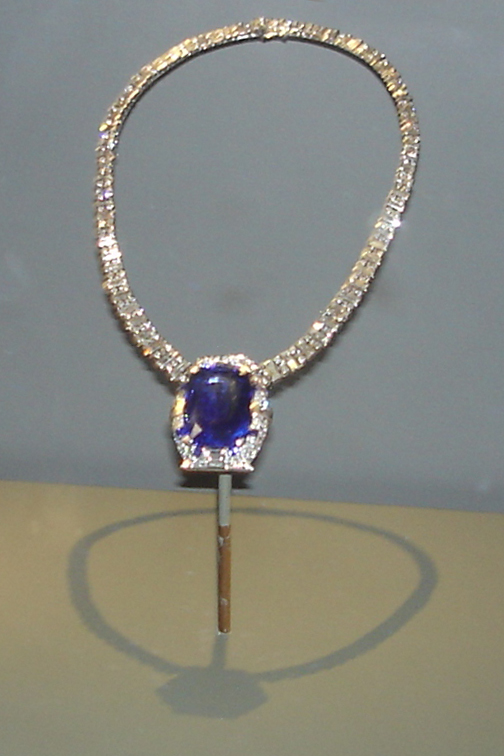
The Bismarck Sapphire Necklace on display at the National Museum of Natural History in Washington D.C.

The Bismarck Sapphire Necklace is a sapphire necklace designed by Cartier, Inc. in 1935. As of 2010, the necklace is on display between the Hall Sapphire and Diamond Necklace and the Logan Sapphire in the Janet Annenberg Hooker Hall of Geology, Gems, and Minerals at the Smithsonian Institution's National Museum of Natural History in Washington D.C., United States. It is named after Countess Mona von Bismarck, who donated the piece to the Smithsonian in 1967. The sapphire itself was mined in Burma (now Myanmar), and was purchased by the Countess in Sri Lanka in 1926 during her honeymoon with Harrison Williams.

The necklace consists of a single chain of platinum links connected by pairs of round brilliant cut diamonds. The 98.56-carat (19.712 g) table-cut Bismarck Sapphire is mounted in a pendant at the front of the necklace, surrounded by baguette-cut diamonds and eight smaller square-cut sapphires placed symmetrically around the edges of the setting.

== See also ==
- List of individual gemstones
- List of sapphires by size
