= Queen of Asia =

Queen of Asia may refer to:

- Queen of Asia (gem)
- MV Ever Queen of Asia
- Miss World
- Sen'un Ajia no Joō
