= Star of Adam =

Largest sapphire in the world

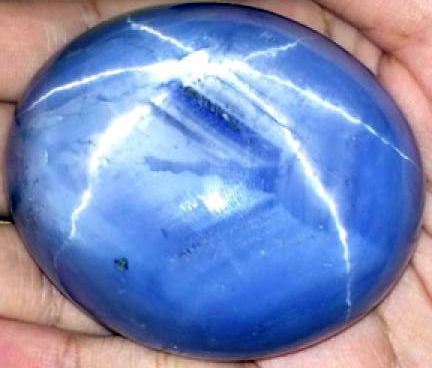
- Type of stone: Sapphire
- Weight: c. 1,404.49 carats (280.898 g)
- Color: Blue (exact colour grade unknown)
- Cut: Oval
- Country of origin: Sri Lanka
- Estimated value: Est. US$100–300 million

The Star of Adam is an oval-shaped blue star sapphire, currently the largest blue star sapphire in the world. It weighs 1,404.49 carats (280.898 g; 9.9084 oz). Prior to its discovery in 2015, the Black Star of Queensland, weighing 733 carats (146.6 g), was the largest star sapphire gem in the world.

== Description ==
The blue-colored gemstone has a six-pointed star-shaped reflection or distinctive mark in the center.

This large star sapphire was discovered in Ratnapura (known by the nickname "City of Gems"), in southern Sri Lanka, in August 2015. It was named "The Star of Adam" by the current owner, as a reference to Muslim beliefs that Adam arrived in Sri Lanka and lived on Adam's Peak after leaving the Garden of Eden.

The owner of the gem, preferring anonymity, told the BBC World Service's Newsday radio programme that "The moment I saw it, I decided to buy", and added "this was not a piece of jewellery but an exhibition piece".

The blue star sapphire's weight of 1,404.49 carats (280.898 g; 9.9084 oz) was certified by the Gemmological Institute of Colombo; the institute said that it had never issued a report on a gemstone larger than "The Star of Adam". However, size means little when it comes to fine gems. Corundum crystals weighing tens of kilograms have been unearthed. A leading gem and jewelry dealer in the country confirmed to the BBC that it was the largest blue star sapphire in the world. In an interview to BBC Earth, Simon Redfern, mineral scientist from the University of Cambridge, said "the stone could have formed within the granite rocks of Sri Lanka's highlands. It was able to grow so big because of constant but slow change in temperatures and pressures within the rocks for millions of years".

Later, the gemstone was valued at over $300 million, but this valuation has been disputed. Bangkok-based Lotus Gemology maintains an updated listing of world auction records of ruby, sapphire and spinel. As of November 2019, no sapphire has ever sold at auction for more than $17,295,796.

== See also ==
- Serendipity Sapphire
- List of individual gemstones
- List of sapphires by size
