= Queen Marie of Romania Sapphire =

Ceylon sapphire

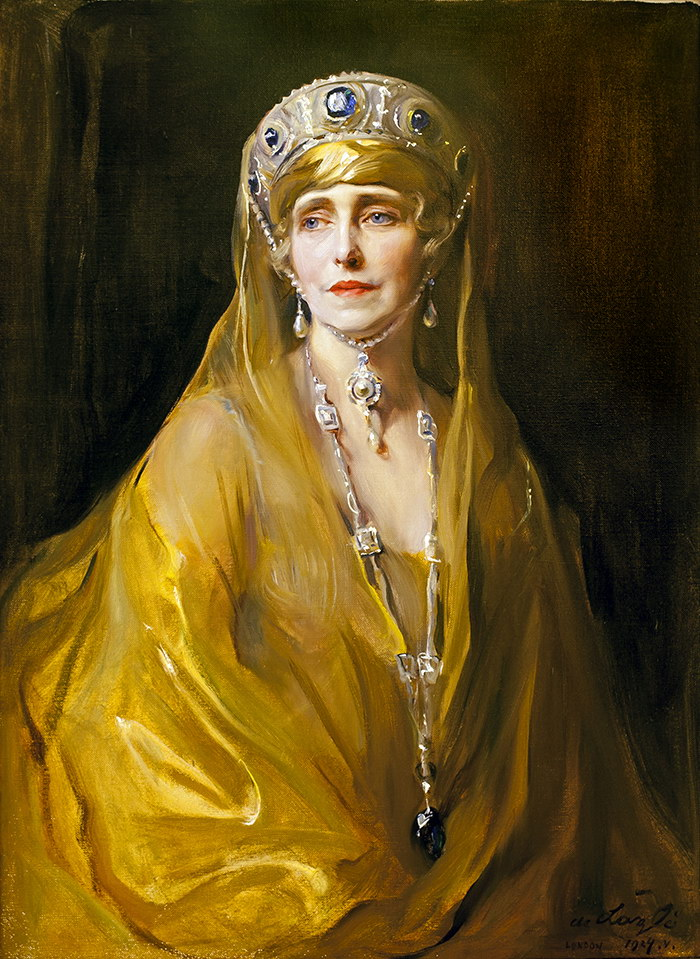
- Queen Marie of Romania wearing her eponymous sapphire as a pendant in a portrait by Philip de László, 1924
- Type of stone: Sapphire
- Weight: 478.68 carats (95.736 g)
- Colour: Cornflower blue
- Country of origin: Sri Lanka
- Original owner: Cartier
- Owner: Private collection
- Estimated value: CHF 1,916,000

The Queen Marie of Romania Sapphire is a 478.68 carat (95.736 g) Cornflower blue cushion cut Ceylon sapphire. When it was sold at Christie's in 2003, it was the largest sapphire ever offered at auction. It is named for its association with its first owner, Marie of Edinburgh, Queen of Romania.

== History ==
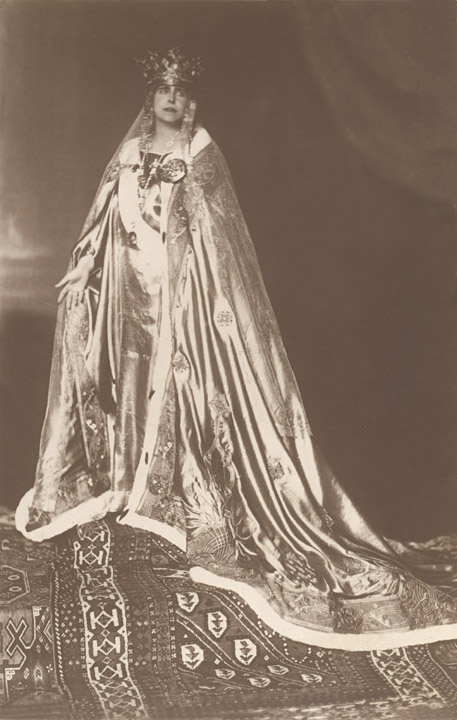
Queen Marie wearing the sapphire as a pendant at her coronation, 15 October 1922

Cartier first mentioned this 478.68 carat (95.736 g) Cornflower blue Ceylon sapphire in 1913 when it was used with seven other sapphires to make a diamond and sapphire sautoir. The design was later altered to be all diamond, save this gemstone, to make it stand out. In 1919, the altered necklace was put on display in San Sebastián, Spain. There, it caught the eye of Queen Victoria Eugenia. She hoped her husband, King Alfonso XIII, would purchase it, but he did not. At the beginning of World War I, Romania's Queen Marie, a first cousin of Spain's Queen Victoria Eugenia, sent her jewels to St. Petersburg for safekeeping. Her jewels were confiscated by the Bolsheviks during the Russian Revolution and were never returned to Marie. To replenish her collection, she bought a large diamond sapphire Kokoshnik-style tiara from her cousin, Grand Duke Kirill Vladimirovich of Russia. When she saw the Cartier sapphire sautoir, she felt it was perfect to go with her new tiara, so her husband, King Ferdinand I, purchased the piece in 1921 on an installment plan, paying around 1,375,000 francs in total.

After the fall of the Romanian monarchy in 1947, the pendant was sold to Harry Winston. Princess Anne of Bourbon-Parma wore the sautoir without the sapphire pendant at her 1948 wedding to Queen Marie's grandson, King Michael, in Athens. It has since been broken up.

Winston sold the gem to a wealthy Greek citizen who presented it to Queen Frederica of Greece, a first cousin twice removed of Queen Marie. Queen Frederica notably wore the sapphire on a visit to the United States in 1964 and the wedding of her son the same year. It was not worn publicly after the Greek monarchy was abolished in 1973.

The sapphire was sold at Christie's as "the property of a noble family" on 18 November 2003 for CHF 1,916,000. It is unclear whether the Greek royal family or another noble family were the sellers. It was bought by a private collector.

== See also ==
- List of individual gemstones
- List of sapphires by size
