= Olympic Australis =

Largest and most valuable opal gemstone

The Olympic Australis opal is the largest and most valuable opal yet found (as of 1961) and was valued at A$2,500,000 in 1997. It was found in 1956 at the 'Eight Mile' opal field near the town of Coober Pedy in South Australia.

The opal was found at a depth of 9.1 metres (30 ft). The Olympic Australis opal was named in honor of the Olympic Games, which were being held in Melbourne in the year of the opal's discovery. It consists of 99% gem opal with an even colour throughout the stone, and has been left in a natural state, unpolished and uncut with blemishes. Olympic Australis is 280 mm long, 120 mm thick, and 115 mm wide (11 in long, 4.75 in thick, and 4.5 in wide). It weighs 17,000 carats (3450 g/121.7 oz/7.6 lbs). As of 1997, the opal is kept in Sydney, at the offices of Altmann & Cherny Ltd.

== See also ==
- List of individual gemstones

Other notable individual opals:

- Andamooka Opal
- Galaxy Opal
- Flame Queen Opal
- Halley's Comet Opal
