= Star of Pure Land =

Natural purple star sapphire

- Type of stone: Sapphire
- Weight: 3,536 carats (707.2 g)
- Dimensions: 66.46 × 67.87 × 71.17 mm
- Color: Purple
- Cut: Round double cabochon
- Country of origin: Sri Lanka
- Discovered: 2023
- Estimated value: US$300 million

The Star of Pure Land is a natural purple star sapphire discovered in Sri Lanka and publicly unveiled in January 2026. Weighing 3,563 carats, it is the largest documented natural purple star sapphire. The gemstone has a six-ray asterism (star effect) that spans the curved face of the stone.

== Description ==
The Star of Pure Land is a natural corundum, classified as a natural star sapphire. It weighs 3,536 carats (707.2 g) and measures 66.46–67.87 mm × 71.17 mm. The stone is round with a double cabochon cutting style, semi-translucent to opaque, and purple in color. The stone displays a six-rayed asterism caused by aligned rutile inclusions within the crystal and shows no indications of heating. An orange foreign material is seen on the surface reaching fractures. The gemstone is presented as a loose, unmounted stone. It is the largest known natural purple star sapphire documented to date.

== Discovery ==
The sapphire was discovered in 2023 near Ratnapura, Sri Lanka, a region known for sapphire mining. The stone remains uncut and was publicly presented in Colombo following its examination.

The Gemological Institute of America confirmed its natural origin and star effect.

== Valuation ==
Industry assessments value the gem in the hundreds of millions of US dollars. As of its unveiling in January 2026, the Star of Pure Land remains held by anonymous owners who have indicated willingness to sell it.

== See also ==
- List of individual gemstones
- List of sapphires by size
