= Andamooka Opal =

Opal given to Queen Elizabeth II

The Andamooka Opal is a famous opal which was presented to Queen Elizabeth II in 1954 on the occasion of her first visit to South Australia. The opal was mined in Andamooka in 1949. The opal was cut and polished by John Altmann to a weight of 203 carats (40.6 g). It displays a magnificent array of reds, blues, and greens and was set with diamonds into an 18 karat (75%) palladium necklet.

== See also ==
- List of individual gemstones

Other notable individual opals:

- Galaxy Opal
- Flame Queen Opal
- Halley's Comet Opal
- Olympic Australis Opal
