= Galaxy Opal =

World's largest polished opal gemstone

The Galaxy Opal is the world's largest polished opal, certified by the Guinness Book of World Records in 1992. It was found at the Boi Morto Mine in Brazil in 1976. The finished opal weighs approximately 3,749 carats, or 0.75 kg. It was carved from a grapefruit-sized piece of rough stone weighing 5,205 carats by Scott Cooley into a shape resembling a child's head. The weight of the finished stone was beyond the capacity of any gem measuring scale at the Gemological Institute of America and an approximation of its weight in carats had to be determined using a postal scale. The stone measures 14.0 by 10.2 by 4.1 centimetres (5.5 in × 4.0 in × 1.6 in). It is currently part of a private collection.

== See also ==
- List of individual gemstones

Other notable individual opals:

- Andamooka Opal
- Flame Queen Opal
- Halley's Comet Opal
- Olympic Australis Opal
