= Serendipity Sapphire =

World's largest star sapphire cluster

- Type of stone: Sapphire
- Weight: ca. 510 kilograms (2,600,000 carats)
- Color: Pale blue
- Country of origin: Sri Lanka
- Estimated value: Est.US$100 million

Serendipity Sapphire is the world's largest star sapphire cluster, and it weighs 510 kilograms (2,600,000 carats). It was found in Kahawatte, in the Ratnapura District, Sri Lanka, in July 2021. Its worth is estimated to be up to US$100 million.

The cluster is 100 centimetres (39 in) in length, 72 centimetres (28 in) in width, and 50 centimetres (20 in) in height.

== See also ==
- List of individual gemstones
- List of sapphires by size
