= List of sapphires by size =

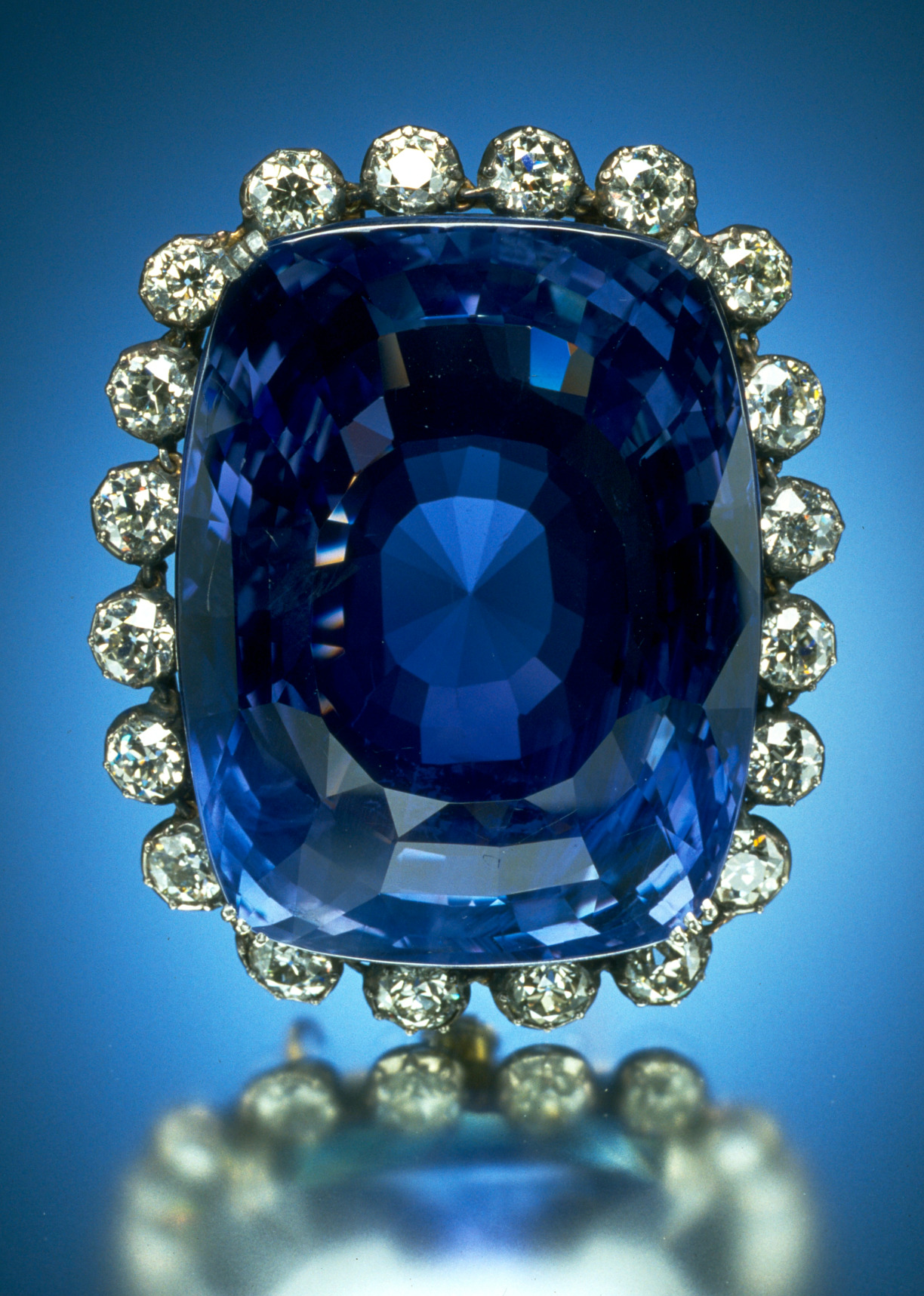
The Logan Sapphire

This is a list of sapphires by size.

== Sapphire ==
Sapphires are a precious gemstone, a variety of the mineral corundum, consisting of aluminum oxide (α-Al_{2}O_{3}) with trace amounts of elements, such as: iron, titanium, chromium, copper or magnesium. It is typically blue, but natural "fancy" sapphires also occur in yellow, purple, orange, and green colors; "parti sapphires" show two or more colors. The only color corundum stone that the term sapphire is not used for is red, which is called a ruby. Pink colored corundum may be either classified as ruby or sapphire depending on locale. Commonly, natural sapphires are cut and polished into gemstones and worn in jewelry. They also may be created synthetically in laboratories for industrial or decorative purposes in large crystal boules. Because of the remarkable hardness of sapphires – 9 on the Mohs scale (the third hardest mineral, after diamond at 10 and moissanite at 9.5) – sapphires are also used in some non-ornamental applications, such as infrared optical components, high-durability windows, wristwatch crystals and movement bearings, and very thin electronic wafers, which are used as the insulating substrates of special-purpose solid-state electronics such as integrated circuits and GaN-based blue LEDs.

Sapphire is the birthstone for September and the gem of the 45^{th} anniversary. A sapphire jubilee occurs after 65 years.

== List of sapphires ==
Sapphire	Origin	Date	Size	Cut	Color	Location	Ref
Star of Pure Land	Sri Lanka	2023	3,536 carats (707.2 g)	Star	Purple	Anonymous owner	
Star of Adam	Sri Lanka	2015	1,404.49 carats (280.898 g)	Star	Blue	Anonymous owner	
Black Star of Queensland	Australia	1938	733 carats (146.6 g)	Star	Black	Anonymous owner	
Star of India	Sri Lanka		563.4 carats (112.68 g)	Star	Blue-gray	American Museum of Natural History, New York	
Queen Marie of Romania	Sri Lanka		478.68 carats (95.736 g)	Cushion	Blue	Anonymous owner	
Logan Sapphire	Sri Lanka		422.99 carats (84.598 g)	Cushion	Blue	National Museum of Natural History, Washington	
Star of Asia	Burma		330 carats (66 g)	Star	Blue	National Museum of Natural History, Washington	
Star of Artaban	Sri Lanka		287 carats (57.4 g)	Star	Blue-violet	National Museum of Natural History, Washington	
Star of Bombay	Sri Lanka		182 carats (36.4 g)	Star	Blue-violet	National Museum of Natural History, Washington	
Ruspoli Sapphire			136.9 carats (27.38 g)				
Stuart Sapphire	Sri Lanka		104 carats (20.8 g)		Blue	Tower of London	
Bismarck Sapphire	Myanmar		98.56 carats (19.712 g)	Table	Blue	National Museum of Natural History, Washington	
James J. Hill Sapphire			22.66 carats (4.532 g)		Cornflower	National Museum of Natural History, Washington	

== See also ==
- List of emeralds by size
- List of gold nuggets by size
- List of individual gemstones

== Bibliography ==
Notes
