= Flame Queen Opal =

Gemstone and "eye-of-opal" example

The Flame Queen Opal

The Flame Queen Opal from a different perspective

The Flame Queen Opal is perhaps the best-known example of "eye-of-opal", an eye-like effect created when opal in-fills a cavity.

The Flame Queen's flat central raised dome flashes red or gold depending on the angle of view, and is surrounded by a band of deep blue-green, giving the stone an appearance somewhat like that of a fried egg. The Flame Queen weighs 263.18 carats (52.636 g) and is somewhat triangular in shape, measuring 7.0 x 6.3 x 1.2 centimeters (2.75 x 2.50 x .50 inches).

The Flame Queen was discovered in 1914 by three partners: Jack Philips, Walter Bradley and "Irish" Joe Hegarty, at the Bald Hill Workings, Lightning Ridge, New South Wales, Australia.

Tunneling down at around 30 feet (9.1 m) revealed no trace of the tell-tale coloring in the clay that indicates the likely presence of opal. However, despite the poor ventilation and the constant danger of tunnel collapse, Bradley and Philips wanted to continue digging. At 35 feet (11 m), Bradley's pick found a large, black opal nodule. It was not until they reached the surface that the true nature of their find was revealed.

Bradley was the most skilled lapidary, and he was entrusted to cut and polish the great stone. By this time the partners were tired and broke; they sold the Flame Queen for just £93.

The Flame Queen was exhibited at the Geological museum, London, in 1937 on the occasion of the Coronation of King George VI and again at the Gemological Institute, London, in 1980–81. At one time it was a part of the renowned Kelsey I. Newman Collection, and more recently the Jack Plane Collection.

== See also ==
- List of individual gemstones

Other notable individual opals:

- Andamooka Opal
- Galaxy Opal
- Halley's Comet Opal
- Olympic Australis Opal
