= Halley's Comet Opal =

Record-setting black opal

The Halley's Comet Opal is the largest uncut black opal in the world, according to the Guinness Book of World Records. It is so named because it was unearthed in 1986, a year when Halley's Comet could be seen from Earth. It is the third-largest gem-grade black opal ever recorded, the largest one extant, and the largest specimen ever found in its region. It was found at Lightning Ridge, New South Wales, Australia, by the Lunatic Hill Mining Syndicate. It weighs 1,982.5 carats (396.5 g; 13.99 oz) and is about the size of a man's fist. The Halley's Comet Opal is a very fine specimen, with few flaws or blemishes and a large green and orange 1.6 cm (0.63 in) thick color bar which goes through the opal. Formed about 20 million years ago, it is an example of a nobby, which is a natural lump-shaped opal found only at Lightning Ridge. As of 2006 it was for sale at $1.2 million.

== See also ==
- List of individual gemstones
- Andamooka Opal
- Flame Queen Opal
- Galaxy Opal
- Olympic Australis Opal
