= Black Star of Queensland =

Sapphire

Black Star of Queensland, Star Sapphire
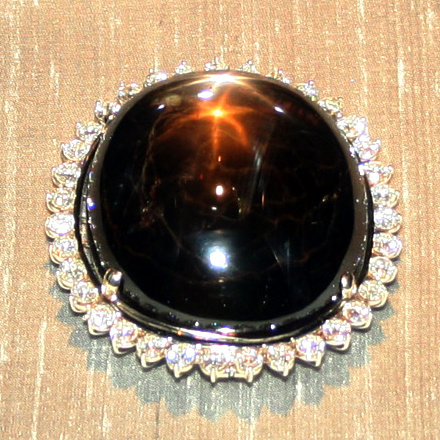
- The 733-carat Black Star of Queensland

General
- Category: Oxide mineral

Identification
- Color: Black

The Black Star of Queensland, also known as the Brimstone of Queensland, named after its nature and place of origin, is a 733-carat (146.6 g) black sapphire, and was the world's largest gem quality star sapphire until the Star of Adam was discovered.

The Black Star sapphire is an oval-shaped gemstone cut as a cabochon like all other star sapphires. The center of the star is much bigger and brighter than normal star sapphires. The bright six-ray star is set in a completely black background. The beauty of the stone is further enhanced by its white gold setting. The large black stone is surrounded by a row of 35 pear-shaped smaller white diamonds.

As with all star sapphires, the star moves with changing angles of illumination and observation and belongs to the group of minerals known as corundum, a crystalline form of aluminum oxide (Al_{2}O_{3}).

The star effect in star sapphires is caused by microscopic inclusions, mainly rutile, aligned in a threefold pattern inside the stone that reflects the light entering the stone through its dome shaped face into a six-ray star pattern.

The gem was first discovered in 1938 by 12 year old Roy Spencer, who found the stone in a nearby hillside in Queensland, Australia. Roy took the stone home to show his father, Harry Spencer, who regarded the stone as a large black crystal and used it as a doorstop for 10 years. In 1947, Armenian-born, Los Angeles-based jeweler Harry Kazanjian visited the Spencer family and took interest in the stone. Harry Spencer agreed to sell the stone to Kazanjian for $18,000, with which Spencer built a new house for his family. Kazanjian spent two months studying the stone before making the decision to cut it, sacrificing over 400 carats to reveal the six-pointed star.

The gemstone was loaned to the Smithsonian Institution's National Museum of Natural History in Washington, D.C., in 1969, and in 1971 it received some brief television fame when the stone featured around the neck of Cher on an episode of The Sonny & Cher Comedy Hour. Since this time, in spite of a small number of charity events, the stone has rarely been seen in public.

Eager to fulfill a childhood dream, with an overwhelming desire to own the stone, jeweler and artist Jack Armstrong, along with his wealthy girlfriend Gabrielle Grohe, convinced the Kazanjian family to sell the stone to fund a scholarship at the Gemological Institute of America.

A lengthy, controversial and bitter international ownership battle between Armstrong and Grohe ensued, marked by the New York Post which ran a story with the headline "Heavyweight Gem $cuffle". The legal dispute ended quietly outside of court in a confidential agreement. According to court documents, Armstrong agreed to pay $500,000 within three months to buy out Grohe.

== See also ==
- List of individual gemstones
- List of sapphires by size
