= American Golden Topaz =

Large yellow topaz specimen

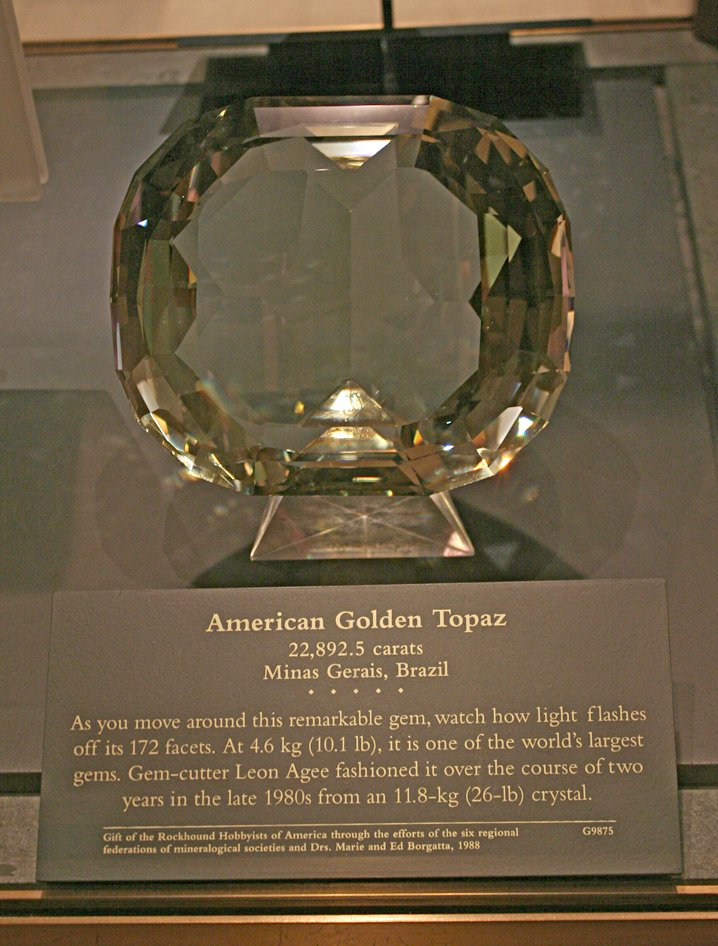
The American Golden Topaz, housed in the National Museum of Natural History, Washington D.C.

The American Golden Topaz, a 172-faceted topaz weighing 22,892.5 carats (4.57850 kg; 10.0939 lb), is the largest cut yellow topaz in the world, and one of the largest faceted gems of any type in the world. Originating from Minas Gerais, Brazil, it was cut by Leon Agee over a period of two years from an 11.8 kg (26 lb avdp) stream-rounded cobble owned by Drs. Marie L. and Edgar F. Borgatta. It was contributed jointly by the Borgatta owners and by Rockhound Hobbyists of America to the Smithsonian Institution in 1988 and is displayed in the National Museum of Natural History in Washington, D.C.

== See also ==
- List of individual gemstones
