= Chalmers Topaz =

Topaz gemstone

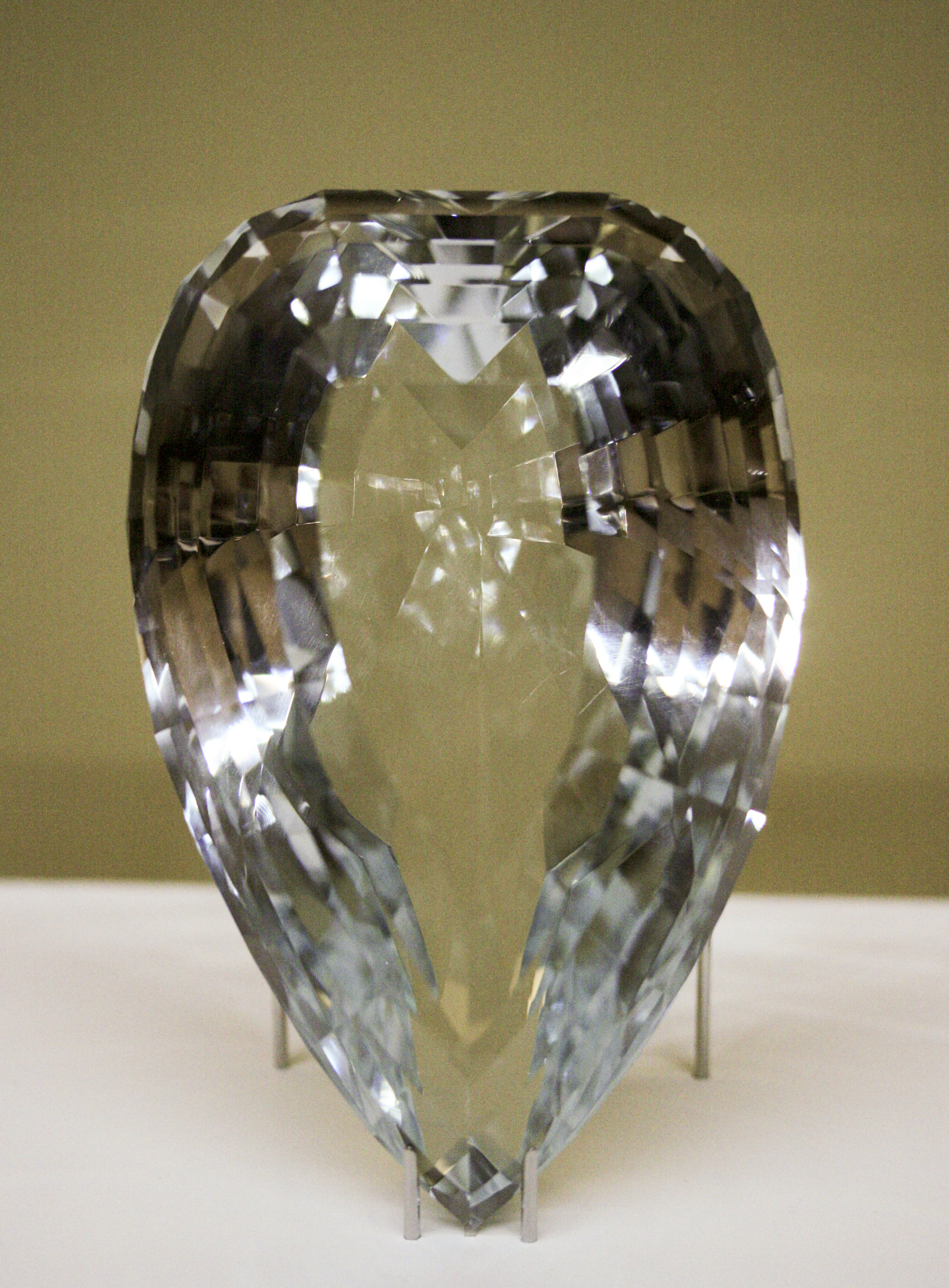
The topaz in the Field Museum (2009)

The Chalmer's Topaz is a topaz gem weighing 5,899.5-carats located in Chicago, Illinois' Grainger Hall of Gems, in the Field Museum of Natural History. It was named for former Field Museum trustee William J. Chalmers and his wife Joan Chalmers, who established a fund used to purchase gemstones for the Field Museum collections. The Chalmers Topaz is one of the largest cut topaz gems in the world.

== See also ==
- List of individual gemstones
