= Arco Valley Pearl =

The Arco Valley Pearl is a white 575 carats (115.0 g) natural blister baroque pearl with pink and yellow overtones. It measures 79 x 41 x 34 mm. It is the largest natural pearl outside a museum and the second biggest ever. Mongol emperor Kublai Khan reportedly gave it to Marco Polo.

During 2007, a UAE collector said he had bought the pearl from a French owner for US$8 million but it is still owned by a European company (August 2008).
