= Richard W. Hughes =

American gemologist and author

Richard Hughes
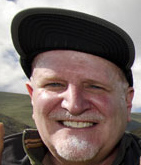
- Richard Hughes in 2011
- Years active: 1980–present
- Known for: Gemology

Richard W. Hughes is an American gemologist and author who specialises in corundum, particularly rubies and sapphires. He is a co-founder of Lotus Gemology, a gemological testing laboratory based in Bangkok, Thailand.

== Career ==
Richard W. Hughes graduated from the Asian Institute of Gemological Sciences (AIGS) in Bangkok, Thailand, in 1980. He became a Fellow of the Gemological Association of Great Britain (FGA) in 1982. Hughes served as director of AIGS in the 1980s. In 1997, he published Ruby & Sapphire.

Hughes has authored and co-authored several books on gemstones and has published articles in the field of gemology. He received the American Gem Society's Richard T. Liddicoat Journalism Award in 2004 and again in 2005.

== Books ==
- Terra Spinel: Terra Firma, Vladyslav Y. Yavorskyy and Hughes, R.W. (2010). Bangkok: Yavorskyy Co., 202 pp., ISBN 978-0-615-40901-6
- Ruby & Sapphire, Hughes, R.W. (1997) Boulder, CO, RWH Publishing, 512pp. ISBN 978-0-9645097-6-4
- Corundum, Hughes, R.W. (1990). Northamptonshire, UK: Butterworth’s Gem Books, Butterworth-Heinemann, 314 pp., ISBN 978-0-7506-1007-0
- The Book of Ruby & Sapphire, Halford-Watkins, J.F. and Hughes, R.W. (2012). RWH Publishing, 434 pp., ISBN 978-0-9645097-0-2

== See also ==
- Gemology
