= Abernethy pearl =

Scottish freshwater pearl discovered in 1967

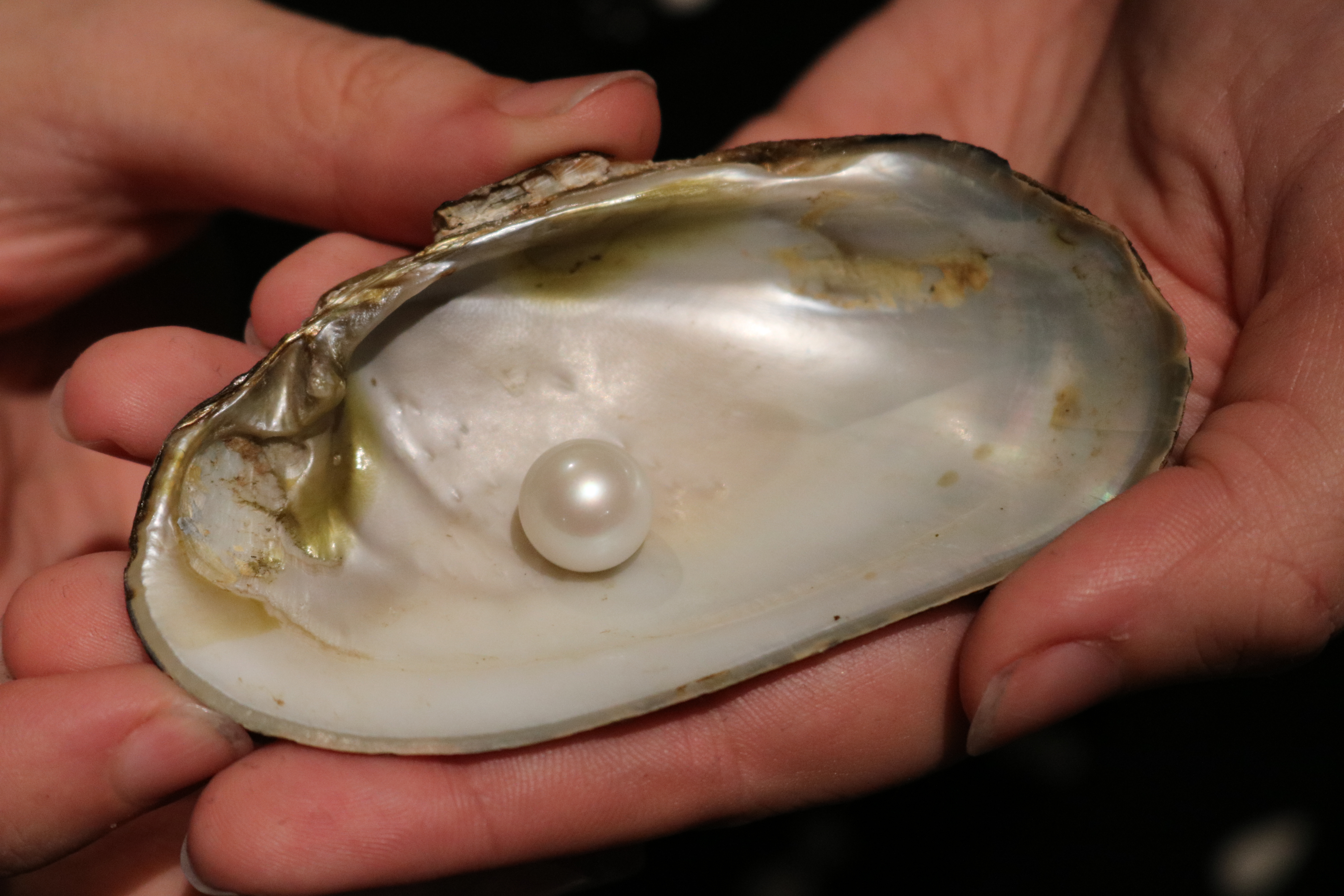
The Abernethy pearl, with the mussel shell in which it was discovered.

The Abernethy Pearl, also known as the Little Willie Pearl, is a 43.60-grain (2.825 g) freshwater pearl named after William Abernethy (1925–2021), who discovered it in the River Tay in Scotland in 1967. It is also known as Bill's Pearl.

The Abernethy Pearl was produced by a mussel belonging to the species Margaritifera margaritifera. It is spherically shaped and coloured white with a slightly pink overtone.

The pearl was reportedly valued at £10,000 in 1967 (equivalent to £205,926 in 2024). It was displayed at A&G Cairncross jewellers in Perth before being sold at auction for £93,951 in 2024. It is now on display at the National Museum of Scotland.
