= Logan Sapphire =

423-carat blue sapphire

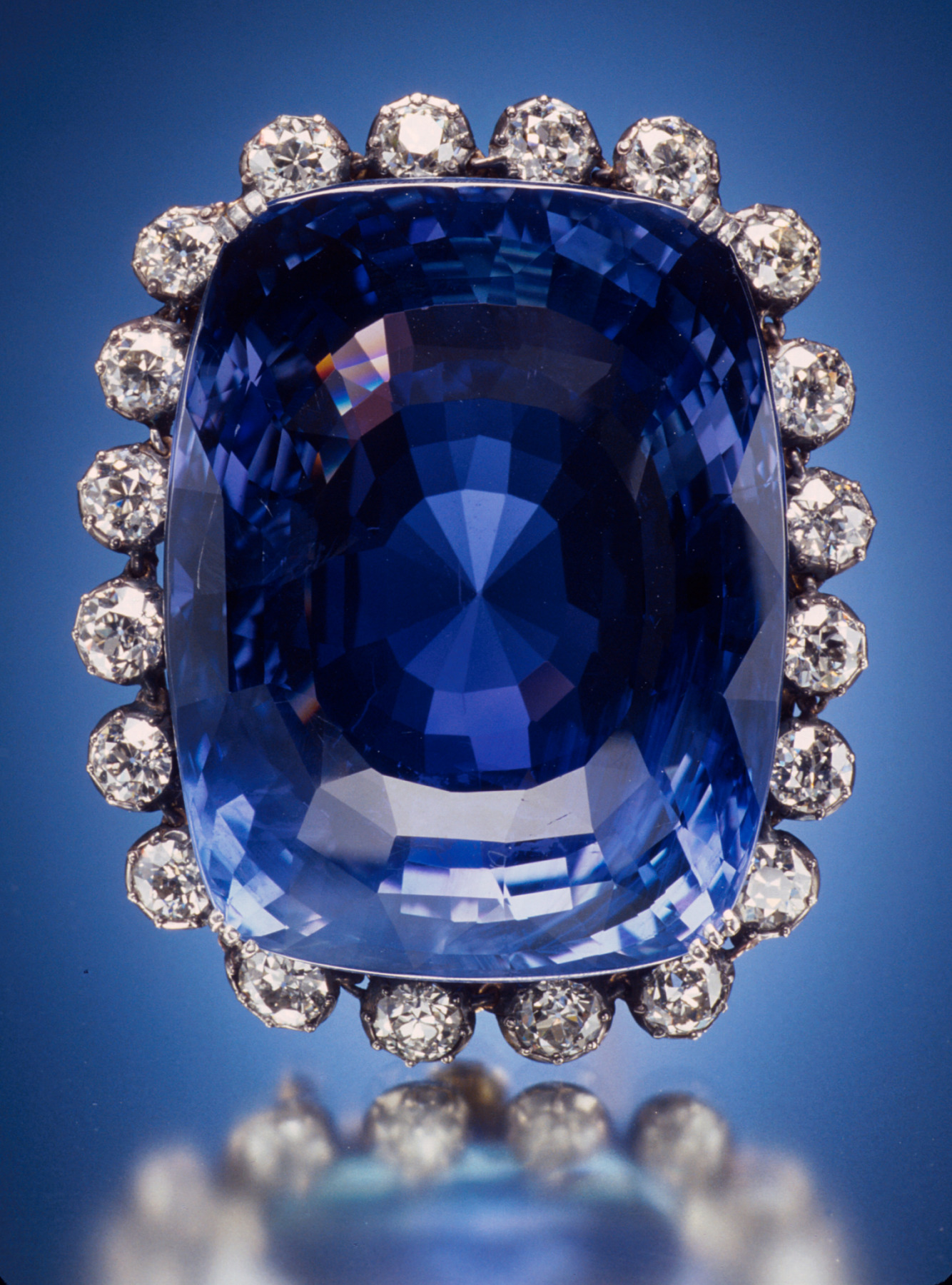
The Logan Sapphire brooch, National Museum of Natural History, Washington, D.C.

The Logan Sapphire is a 422.98-carat (84.596 g) sapphire from Sri Lanka. One of the largest blue faceted sapphires in the world, it was owned by Victor Sassoon and then purchased by M. Robert Guggenheim as a gift for his wife, Rebecca Pollard Guggenheim, who donated the sapphire to the Smithsonian Institution in 1960. The sapphire's name is derived from her new surname after marrying John A. Logan following Guggenheim's death. It has been displayed in the National Gem Collection of the National Museum of Natural History in Washington, D.C., since 1971. It is a mixed cushion-cut sapphire, approximately the size of a large chicken egg, and set in a silver and gold brooch surrounded by 20 round brilliant-cut diamonds.

== Description ==
The Logan Sapphire weighs 422.98 carats (84.596 g) and is approximately the size of a large chicken egg, measuring 49.23 mm × 38.26 mm × 20.56 mm (1.938 in × 1.506 in × 0.809 in). It is a mixed cushion-cut sapphire (having a rounded rectangular shape) and is blue with slight shades of violet. The cut is designed to highlight its color rather than to improve its brilliance. In 1997, the Gemological Institute of America determined that the Logan Sapphire's color was natural and that it had not previously undergone heat treatment, a technique that is sometimes used to enhance the color or mechanical properties of gemstones. It fluoresces reddish-orange when exposed to ultraviolet radiation. This phenomenon, as well as the slight violet tones, indicates trace amounts of the element chromium in the sapphire's structure.

The Logan Sapphire is one of the largest blue faceted sapphires in the world. Rutile inclusions, commonly found inside Sri Lankan sapphires, are visible inside the gemstone. It is set in a silver and gold brooch and surrounded by 20 round brilliant cut diamonds. In total, the diamonds weigh approximately 16 carats (3.2 g). The diamonds were likely taken from an antique bracelet or necklace. A 1958 article in Ladies' Home Journal by Rebecca Pollard Guggenheim, its owner at the time, suggests that it was set in the brooch sometime after she had acquired it several years earlier, but further details of its setting are unknown.

== History ==
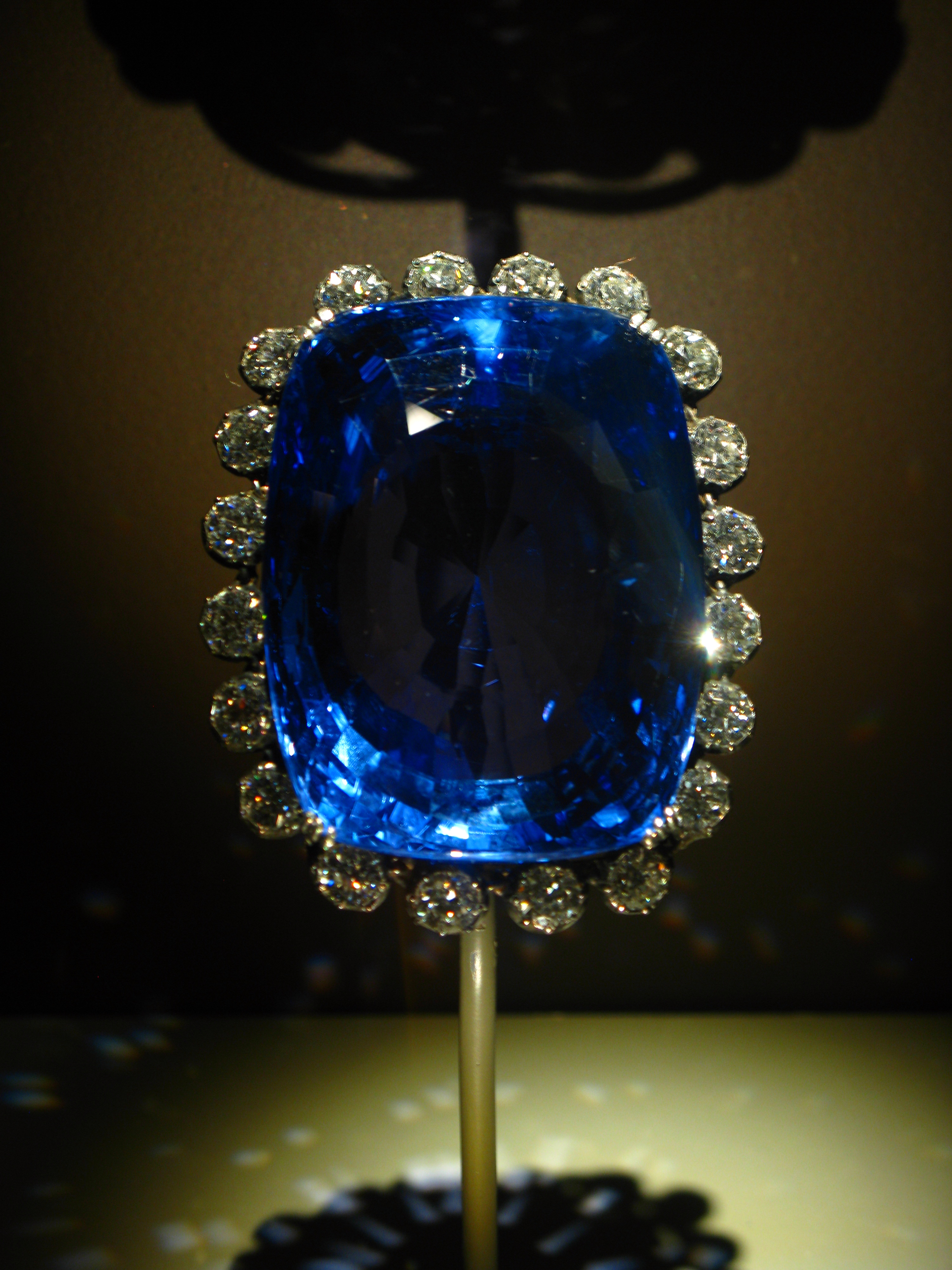
The Logan Sapphire on display

The sapphire was mined from Sri Lanka. It is a "Ceylon sapphire", a term derived from the former name of Sri Lanka, and likely originates from Ratnapura, known as the "City of Gems". A New York jeweler who possessed the sapphire claimed that its first owner was a Sri Lankan native who was beheaded for withholding his discovery from his leader. However, this story is likely fabricated. One of the sapphire's early owners was Sir Victor Sassoon, 3rd Baronet of Bombay, a member of the wealthy Sassoon family. According to the Smithsonian Institution, the Sassoons may have acquired the sapphire from an Indian maharaja. It was exhibited at the 1939 New York World's Fair. Sassoon planned to auction the sapphire in 1941 to raise money for the British war effort during World War II, but the auction did not take place.

In the early 1950s, the American diplomat M. Robert Guggenheim purchased the sapphire from Sassoon. He gave it to his wife, Rebecca Pollard Guggenheim, as a Christmas and anniversary present in 1952. In Ladies' Home Journal, she recalled her reaction upon seeing it: "I was simply overcome. [...] It's simply not a stone you could wear casually. All I could think was, I'll never be able to wear it. And of course, I loved it." She often wore it on a clip at formal events, but the sapphire was so heavy that she had to wear it with a shoulder strap. In December 1960, a year after Robert's death, Rebecca deeded four-sevenths of it to the Smithsonian Institution, and the remaining portion the following year. This transaction was only in deed; the sapphire was not physically divided, and it was not publicly exhibited until almost a decade later. She wanted it to be reserved to be worn only by the First Lady of the United States "at such state and other occasions as may be appropriate", though it has never been used for this purpose.

Rebecca Guggenheim changed her surname to Logan in 1962 after marrying John A. Logan, a management consultant, and the sapphire became known as the "Logan Sapphire". It was the first of several gifts from wealthy donors that came after the Smithsonian's acquisition of the Hope Diamond in 1958; another was the Napoleon Diamond Necklace. The Logan Sapphire was physically transferred to the Smithsonian in April 1971. According to Paul Desautels, the museum's curator at the time, Logan finally parted ways with the sapphire because it reminded her of her late husband's extramarital affairs.

Since 1971, the Logan Sapphire has been on display in the National Gem Collection of the National Museum of Natural History in Washington, D.C. (catalog number NMNH G3703-00). It is the largest and heaviest mounted gem in the collection.

== See also ==
- List of sapphires by size
- List of individual gemstones
