= Sapphire =

Gem variety of the mineral corundum

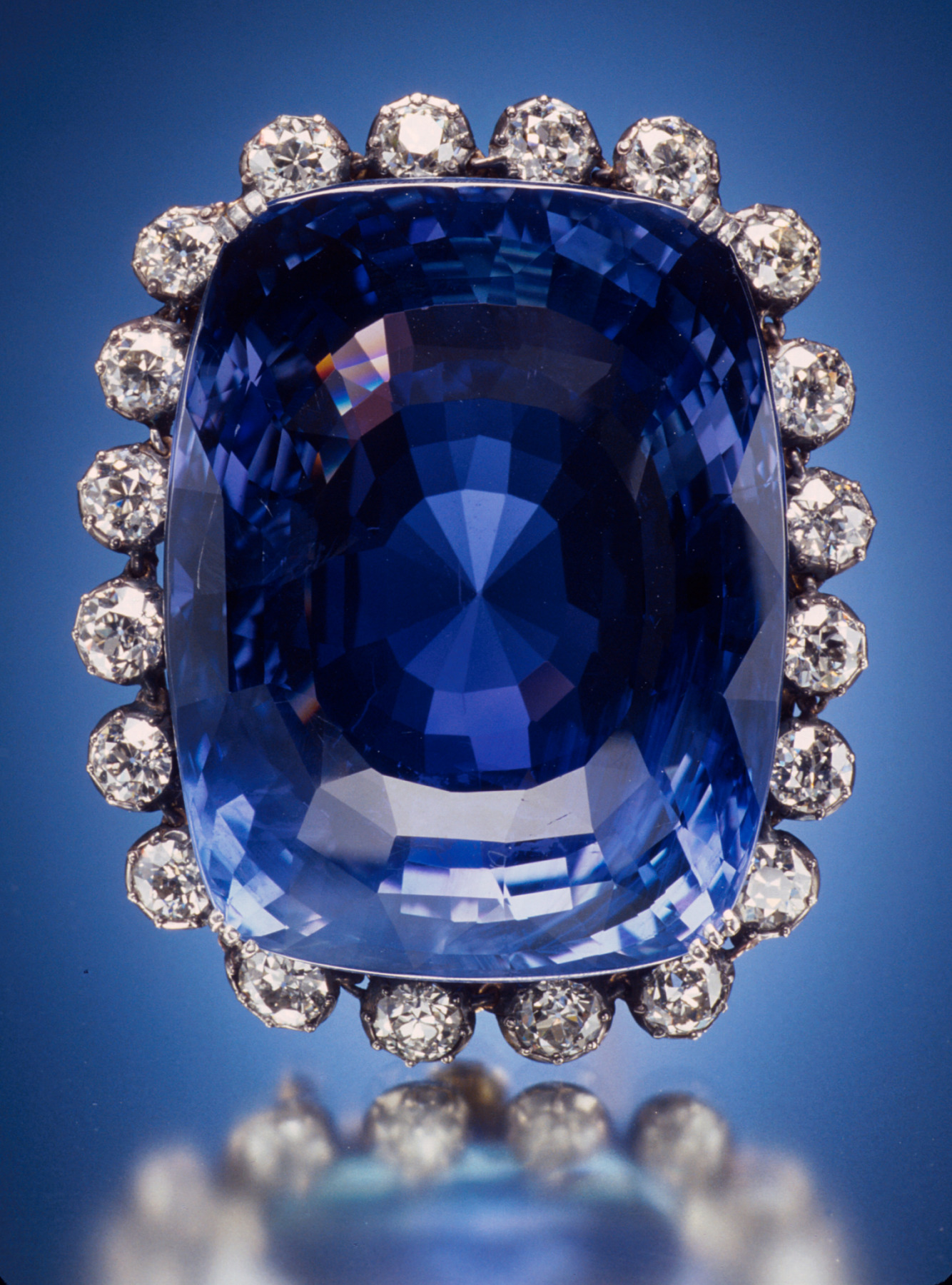
- The 423-carat (85 g) blue Logan Sapphire

General
- Category: Oxide mineral
- Formula: Aluminium oxide, Al_{2}O_{3}
- Crystal system: Trigonal
- Crystal class: Hexagonal scalenohedral (3̅m); H-M symbol: (3̅2/m)
- Space group: R3̅c

Identification
- Color: Typically blue, but varies
- Crystal habit: As crystals, massive and granular
- Twinning: Both growth twins (in various orientations) and polysynthetic glide twinning on the rhombohedron [101̅1
- Cleavage: Poor
- Fracture: Conchoidal, splintery
- Mohs scale hardness: 9.0
- Luster: Vitreous
- Streak: Colorless
- Diaphaneity: Transparent to nearly opaque
- Specific gravity: 3.98–4.06
- Optical properties: Uniaxial (–), Abbe number 72.2
- Refractive index: n_{ω} = 1.768–1.772 n_{ε} = 1.760–1.763
- Birefringence: 0.008
- Pleochroism: Strong
- Melting point: 2,030–2,050 °C
- Fusibility: Infusible
- Solubility: Insoluble
- Other characteristics: Coefficient of thermal expansion (5.0–6.6)×10^{−6}/K relative permittivity at 20 °C ε = 8.9–11.1 (anisotropic)

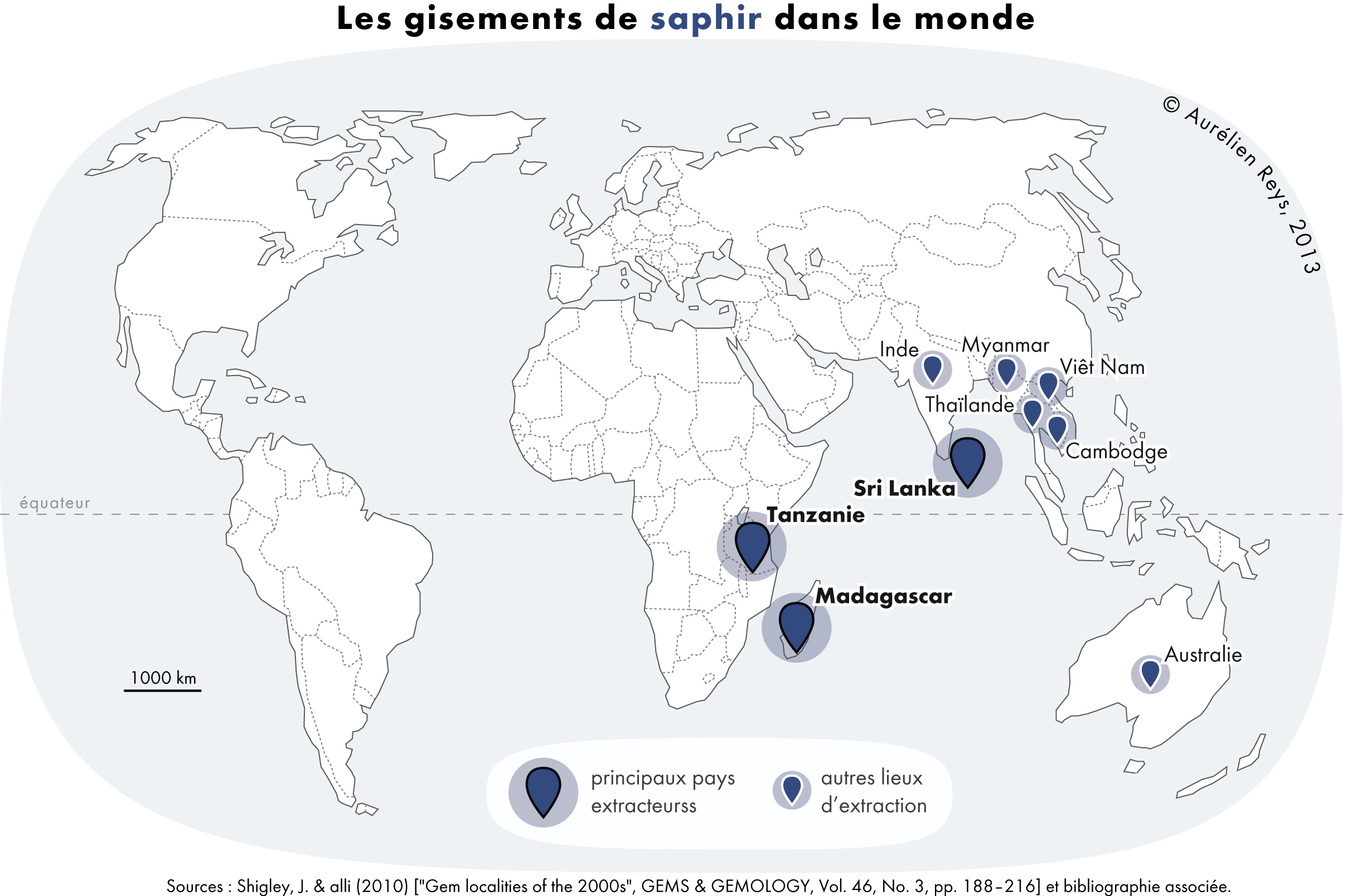
Main sapphire-producing countries

Sapphire is a precious gemstone, a variety of the mineral corundum, consisting of aluminium oxide (α-Al_{2}O_{3}) with trace amounts of elements such as iron, titanium, cobalt, lead, chromium, vanadium, magnesium, boron, and silicon. The name sapphire is derived from the Latin word sapphirus, itself from the Greek word sappheiros (σάπφειρος, itself from the Hebrew sapir), which referred to lapis lazuli. Sapphire with colors other than its typical blue is referred to as "fancy sapphire", and can be in yellow, purple, orange, and green colors; "parti sapphires" show two or more colors. Red corundum stones also occur, but are called rubies rather than sapphires. Pink-colored corundum may be classified either as ruby or sapphire depending on the locale. Commonly, natural sapphires are cut and polished into gemstones and worn in jewelry. They also may be created synthetically in laboratories for industrial or decorative purposes in large crystal boules. It occurs in association with ruby, zircon, biotite, muscovite, calcite, dravite and quartz.

Sapphire has a remarkable hardness, with a score of 9 on the Mohs scale, the third-hardest mineral after diamond at 10 and moissanite at 9.5. Non-ornamental applications include infrared optical components, high-durability windows, wristwatch crystals and movement bearings, and very thin electronic wafers, which are used as the insulating substrates of special-purpose solid-state electronics such as integrated circuits and GaN-based blue LEDs.

== Natural sapphires ==
Sapphire is one of the two gem-varieties of corundum, the other being ruby (defined as corundum in a shade of red). Although blue is the best-known sapphire color, it occurs in other colors, including gray and black, and can also be colorless. A pinkish orange variety of sapphire is called padparadscha.

Significant sapphire deposits are found in Australia, Afghanistan, Cambodia, Cameroon, China (Shandong), Colombia, Ethiopia, India (Jammu and Kashmir), Kenya, Laos, Madagascar, Malawi, Mozambique, Myanmar, Nigeria, Rwanda, Sri Lanka, Tanzania, Thailand, United States (Montana) and Vietnam. Sapphire and rubies are often found in the same geographical settings, but they generally have different geological formations. For example, both ruby and sapphire are found in Myanmar's Mogok Stone Tract, but the rubies form in marble, while the sapphire forms in granitic pegmatites or corundum syenites.

Every sapphire mine produces a wide range of quality, and origin is not a guarantee of quality. For sapphire, Jammu and Kashmir receives the highest premium, although Burma, Sri Lanka, and Madagascar also produce large quantities of fine quality gems.

The cost of natural sapphires varies depending on their color, clarity, size, cut, and overall quality. Sapphires that are completely untreated are worth far more than those that have been treated. Geographical origin also has a major impact on price. For most gems of one carat or more, an independent report from a respected laboratory such as GIA, Lotus Gemology, or SSEF, is often required by buyers before they will make a purchase.

== Colors ==
Sapphires in colors other than blue are called "fancy" sapphires. "Parti sapphire" is used for multicolor stones with zoning of different colors (hues), but not different shades.

Fancy sapphires are found in yellow, orange, green, brown, purple, violet, and practically any other hue.

Gemstone color can be described in terms of hue, saturation, and tone. Hue is commonly understood as the "color" of the gemstone. Saturation refers to the vividness or brightness of the hue, and tone is the lightness to darkness of the hue.

=== Blue sapphire ===
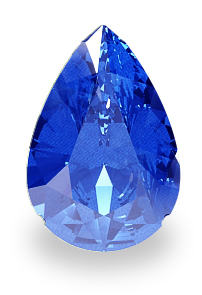
Teardrop-shaped blue sapphire

Blue sapphire exists in various mixtures of its primary (blue) and secondary hues, various tonal levels (shades) and at various levels of saturation (vividness).

Blue sapphires are evaluated based upon the purity of their blue hue. Violet and green are the most common secondary hues found in blue sapphires. The highest prices are paid for gems that are pure blue and of vivid saturation. Gems that are of lower saturation, or are too dark or too light in tone are of less value. However, color preferences are a personal taste.

The 423-carat (84.6 g) Logan sapphire in the National Museum of Natural History, in Washington, D.C., is one of the largest faceted gem-quality blue sapphires in existence.

=== Parti sapphires ===
Particolored sapphires (or bi-color sapphires) are those stones that exhibit two or more colors within a single stone. The desirability of particolored or bi-color sapphires is usually judged based on the zoning or location of their colors, the colors' saturation, and the contrast of their colors. Australia is the largest source of particolored sapphires; they are not commonly used in mainstream jewelry and remain relatively unknown.

=== Pink sapphires ===
Pink sapphires occur in shades from light to dark pink, and deepen in color as the quantity of chromium increases. The deeper the pink color, the higher their monetary value. In the United States, a minimum color saturation must be met to be called a ruby, otherwise the stone is referred to as a pink sapphire.

=== Padparadscha sapphire ===
Padparadscha sapphire is a delicate one, light to medium toned, pink-orange to orange-pink hued corundum, originally found in Sri Lanka, but also found in deposits in Vietnam and parts of East Africa. Padparadscha sapphires are rare; the rarest of all is the totally natural variety, with no sign of artificial treatment.

The name is derived from the Sanskrit padma ranga (lit. 'lotus color'), a color akin to the lotus flower (Nelumbo nucifera).

Among the fancy (non-blue) sapphires, natural padparadscha fetch the highest prices. Since 2001, more sapphires of this color have appeared on the market as a result of artificial lattice diffusion of beryllium.

=== Star sapphire ===
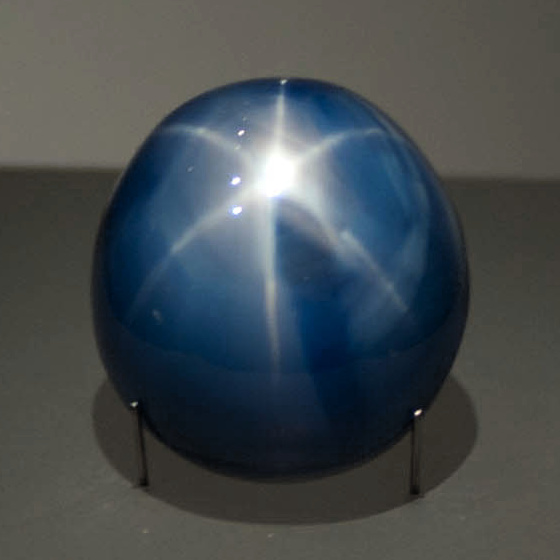
The 193.39 carat Star of Lanka star sapphire

A star sapphire is a type of sapphire that exhibits a star-like phenomenon known as asterism; red stones are known as "star rubies". Star sapphires contain intersecting needle-like inclusions following the underlying crystal structure that causes the appearance of a six-rayed "star"-shaped pattern when viewed with a single overhead light source. The inclusion is often the mineral rutile, a mineral composed primarily of titanium dioxide. The stones are cut en cabochon, typically with the center of the star near the top of the dome. Occasionally, twelve-rayed stars are found, typically because two different sets of inclusions are found within the same stone, such as a combination of fine needles of rutile with small platelets of hematite; the first results in a whitish star and the second results in a golden-colored star. During crystallization, the two types of inclusions become preferentially oriented in different directions within the crystal, thereby forming two six-rayed stars that are superimposed upon each other to form a twelve-rayed star. Misshapen stars or 12-rayed stars may also form as a result of twinning. The inclusions can alternatively produce a cat's eye effect if the girdle plane of the cabochon is oriented parallel to the crystal's c-axis rather than perpendicular to it. To get a cat's eye, the planes of exsolved inclusions must be extremely uniform and tightly packed. If the dome is oriented in between these two directions, an off-center star will be visible, offset away from the high point of the dome.

At 3536 carats, the Star of Pure Land is the largest documented purple star sapphire, discovered in 2023 near Ratnapura, Sri Lanka, a region known for sapphire mining. At 1404.49 carats, the Star of Adam is the largest known blue star sapphire, also from Ratnapura. The Black Star of Queensland weighs 733 carats. The Star of India mined in Sri Lanka and weighing 563.4 carats is currently on display at the American Museum of Natural History in New York City. The 182-carat Star of Bombay, mined in Sri Lanka and located in the National Museum of Natural History in Washington, D.C., is another example of a large blue star sapphire. The value of a star sapphire depends not only on the weight of the stone, but also the body color, visibility, and intensity of the asterism. The color of the stone has more impact on the value than the visibility of the star. Since more transparent stones tend to have better colors, the most expensive star stones are semi-transparent "glass body" stones with vivid colors.

On 28 July 2021, the world's largest cluster of star sapphires, weighing 510 kg (1,120 lb), was unearthed from Ratnapura, Sri Lanka. This star sapphire cluster was named "Serendipity Sapphire".

=== Color-change sapphire ===
A rare variety of natural sapphire, known as color-change sapphire, exhibits different colors in different light. Color change sapphires are blue in outdoor light and purple under incandescent indoor light, or green to gray-green in daylight and pink to reddish-violet in incandescent light. Color-change sapphires come from a variety of locations, including Madagascar, Myanmar, Sri Lanka and Tanzania. Two types exist. The first features the chromium chromophore that creates the red color of ruby, combined with the iron + titanium chromophore that produces the blue color in sapphire. A rarer type, which comes from the Mogok area of Myanmar, features a vanadium chromophore, the same as is present in Verneuil synthetic color-change sapphire.

Virtually all gemstones that show the "alexandrite effect" (color change or 'metamerism') show similar absorption/transmission features in the visible spectrum. This is an absorption band in the yellow (~590 nm), along with valleys of transmission in the blue-green and red. Thus the color one sees depends on the spectral composition of the light source. Daylight is relatively balanced in its spectral power distribution (SPD) and since the human eye is most sensitive to green light, the balance is tipped to the green side. However incandescent light (including candle light) is heavily tilted to the red end of the spectrum, thus tipping the balance to red.

Color-change sapphires colored by the Cr + Fe/Ti chromophores generally change from blue or violet-blue to violet or purple. Those colored by the V chromophore can show a more pronounced change, moving from blue-green to purple.

Certain synthetic color-change sapphires have a similar color change to the natural gemstone alexandrite and they are sometimes marketed as "alexandrium" or "synthetic alexandrite". However, the latter term is a misnomer: synthetic color-change sapphires are, technically, not synthetic alexandrites but rather alexandrite simulants. This is because genuine alexandrite is a variety of chrysoberyl: not sapphire, but an entirely different mineral from corundum.

=== Large rubies and sapphires ===
Large rubies and sapphires of poor transparency are frequently used with suspect appraisals that vastly overstate their value. This was the case of the "Life and Pride of America Star Sapphire". Circa 1985, Roy Whetstine claimed to have bought the 1905-ct stone for $10 at the Tucson gem show, but a reporter discovered that L.A. Ward of Fallbrook, California, who appraised it at the price of $1200/ct, had appraised another stone of the exact same weight several years before Whetstine claimed to have found it.

Bangkok-based Lotus Gemology maintains an updated listing of world auction records of ruby, sapphire, and spinel. As of November 2019, no sapphire has ever sold at auction for more than $17,295,796.

== Cause of color ==
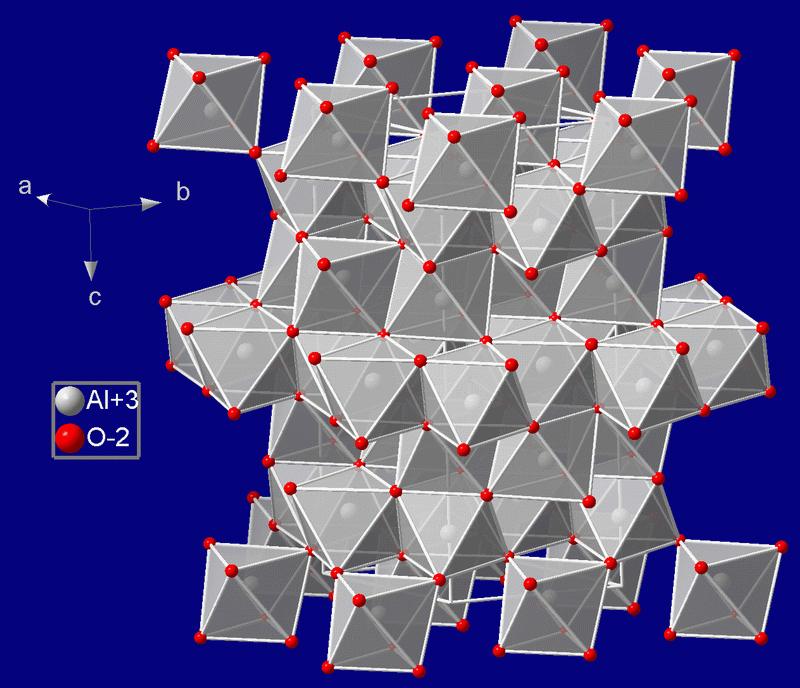
Crystal structure of sapphire

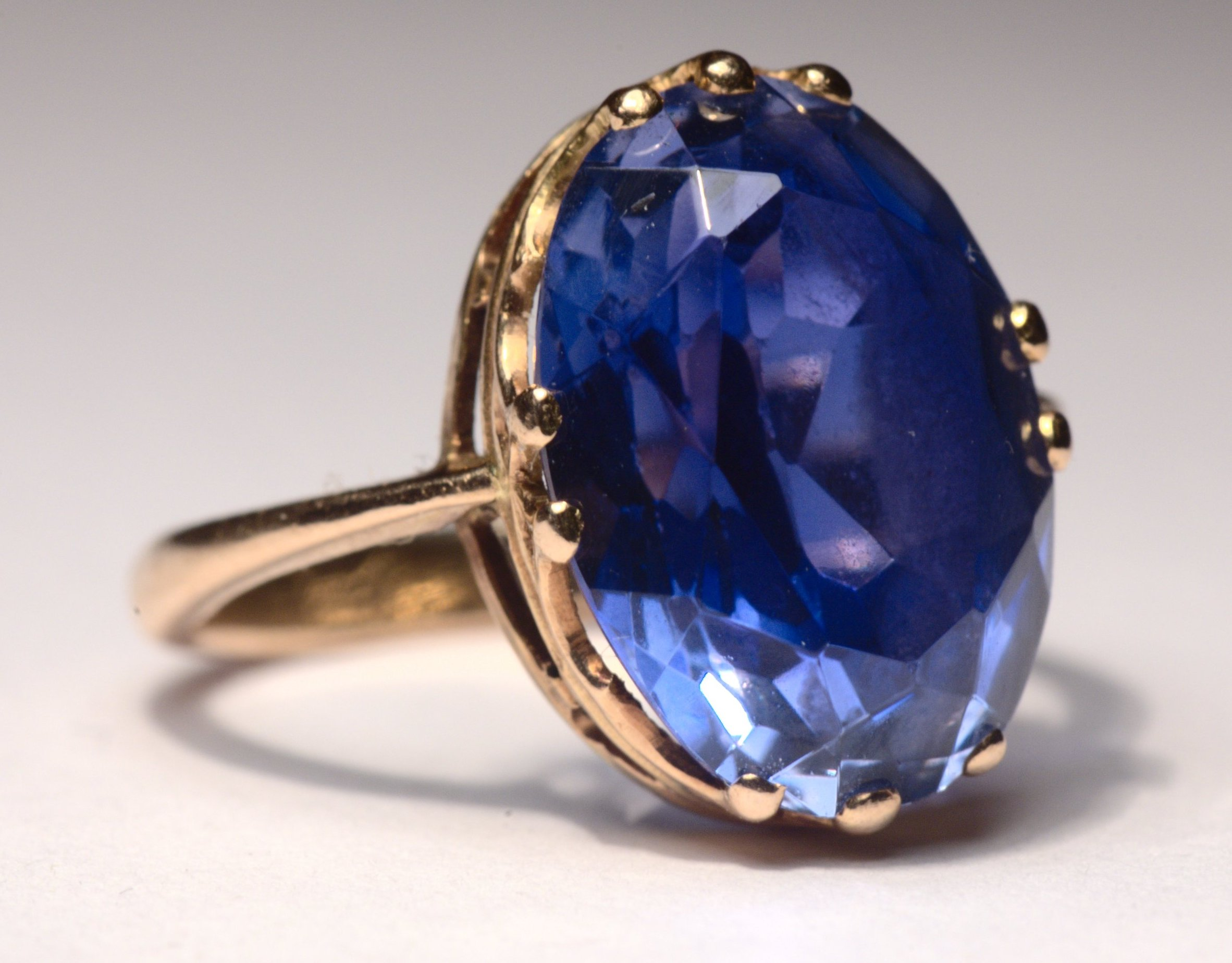
Sapphire ring made c. 1940

Rubies are corundum with a dominant red body color. This is generally caused by traces of chromium (Cr^{3+}) substituting for the (Al^{3+}) ion in the corundum structure. The color can be modified by both iron and trapped hole color centers.

Unlike localized ("intra-atomic") absorption of light, which causes color for chromium and vanadium impurities, blue color in sapphires comes from intervalence charge transfer, which is the transfer of an electron from one transition-metal ion to another via the conduction or valence band. The iron can take the form Fe^{2+} or Fe^{3+}, while titanium generally takes the form Ti^{4+}. If Fe^{2+} and Ti^{4+} ions are substituted for Al^{3+}, localized areas of charge imbalance are created. An electron transfer from Fe^{2+} and Ti^{4+} can cause a change in the valence state of both. Because of the valence change, there is a specific change in energy for the electron, and electromagnetic energy is absorbed. The wavelength of the energy absorbed corresponds to yellow light. When this light is subtracted from incident white light, the complementary color blue results. Sometimes when atomic spacing is different in different directions, there is resulting blue-green dichroism.

Purple sapphires contain trace amounts of chromium and iron plus titanium and come in a variety of shades. Corundum that contains extremely low levels of chromophores is near colorless. Completely colorless corundum generally does not exist in nature. If trace amounts of iron are present, a very pale yellow to green color may be seen. However, if both titanium and iron impurities are present together, and in the correct valence states, the result is a blue color.

Intervalence charge transfer is a process that produces a strong colored appearance at a low percentage of impurity. While at least 1% chromium must be present in corundum before the deep red ruby color is seen, sapphire blue is apparent with the presence of only 0.01% of titanium and iron.

Colorless sapphires, which are uncommon in nature, were once used as diamond substitutes in jewelry, and are presently used as accent stones.

The most complete description of the causes of color in corundum extant can be found in Chapter 4 of Ruby & Sapphire: A Gemologist's Guide (chapter authored by John Emmett, Emily Dubinsky and Richard Hughes).

== Mining ==
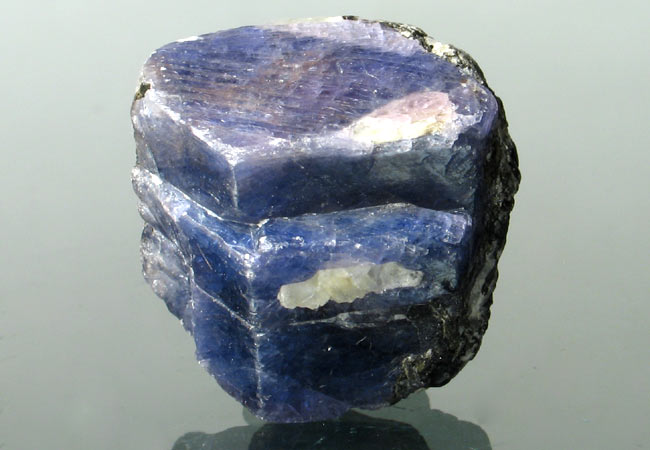
Sapphire from Madagascar

Sapphires are mined from alluvial deposits or from primary underground workings. Commercial mining locations for sapphire and ruby include (but are not limited to) the following countries: Afghanistan, Australia, Myanmar/Burma, Cambodia, China, Colombia, India, Kenya, Laos, Madagascar, Malawi, Nepal, Nigeria, Pakistan, Sri Lanka, Tajikistan, Tanzania, Thailand, United States, and Vietnam. Sapphires from different geographic locations may have different appearances or chemical-impurity concentrations, and tend to contain different types of microscopic inclusions. Because of this, sapphires can be divided into three broad categories: classic metamorphic, non-classic metamorphic or magmatic, and classic magmatic.

Sapphires from certain locations, or of certain categories, may be more commercially appealing than others, particularly classic metamorphic sapphires from Kashmir, Burma, or Sri Lanka that have not been subjected to heat-treatment.

The Logan sapphire, the Star of India, the Star of Adam and the Star of Bombay originate from Sri Lankan mines. Madagascar is the world leader in sapphire production (as of 2007) specifically its deposits in and around the town of Ilakaka. Prior to the opening of the Ilakaka mines, Australia was the largest producer of sapphires (such as in 1987). In 1991 a new source of sapphires was discovered in Andranondambo, southern Madagascar. The exploitation started in 1993, but was practically abandoned just a few years later because of the difficulties in recovering sapphires in their bedrock.

In North America, sapphires have been mined mostly from deposits in Montana: facies along the Missouri River near Helena, Montana, Dry Cottonwood Creek near Deer Lodge, Montana, and Rock Creek near Philipsburg, Montana. Fine blue Yogo sapphires are found at Yogo Gulch west of Lewistown, Montana. A few gem-grade sapphires and rubies have also been found in the area of Franklin, North Carolina.

The sapphire deposits of Kashmir are well known in the gem industry, although their peak production took place in a relatively short period at the end of the nineteenth and early twentieth centuries. These deposits are located in the Paddar Valley of the Jammu region of Jammu and Kashmir in India. They have a superior vivid blue hue, coupled with a mysterious and almost sleepy quality, described by some gem enthusiasts as ‘blue velvet”. Kashmir-origin contributes meaningfully to the value of a sapphire, and most corundum of Kashmir origin can be readily identified by its characteristic silky appearance and exceptional hue. The unique blue appears lustrous under any kind of light, unlike non-Kashmir sapphires which may appear purplish or grayish in comparison. Sotheby's has been in the forefront overseeing record-breaking sales of Kashmir sapphires worldwide. In October 2014, Sotheby's Hong Kong achieved consecutive per-carat price records for Kashmir sapphires – first with the 12.00 carat Cartier sapphire ring at US$193,975 per carat, then with a 17.16 carat sapphire at US$236,404, and again in June 2015 when the per-carat auction record was set at US$240,205. At present, the world record price-per-carat for sapphire at auction is held by a sapphire from Kashmir in a ring, which sold in October 2015 for approximately US$242,000 per carat (HK$52,280,000 in total, including buyer's premium, or more than US$6.74 million).

== Treatments ==
Sapphires can be treated by several methods to enhance and improve their clarity and color. It is common practice to heat natural sapphires to improve or enhance their appearance. This is done by heating the sapphires in furnaces to temperatures between 800 and 1,800 °C (1,470 and 3,270 °F) for several hours, or even weeks at a time. Different atmospheres may be used. Upon heating, the stone becomes bluer in color, but loses some of the rutile inclusions (silk). When high temperatures (1400 °C+) are used, exsolved rutile silk is dissolved and it becomes clear under magnification. The titanium from the rutile enters solid solution and thus creates with iron the blue color. The inclusions in natural stones are easily seen with a jeweler's loupe. Evidence of sapphire and other gemstones being subjected to heating goes back at least to Roman times. Un-heated natural stones are somewhat rare and will often be sold accompanied by a certificate from an independent gemological laboratory attesting to "no evidence of heat treatment".

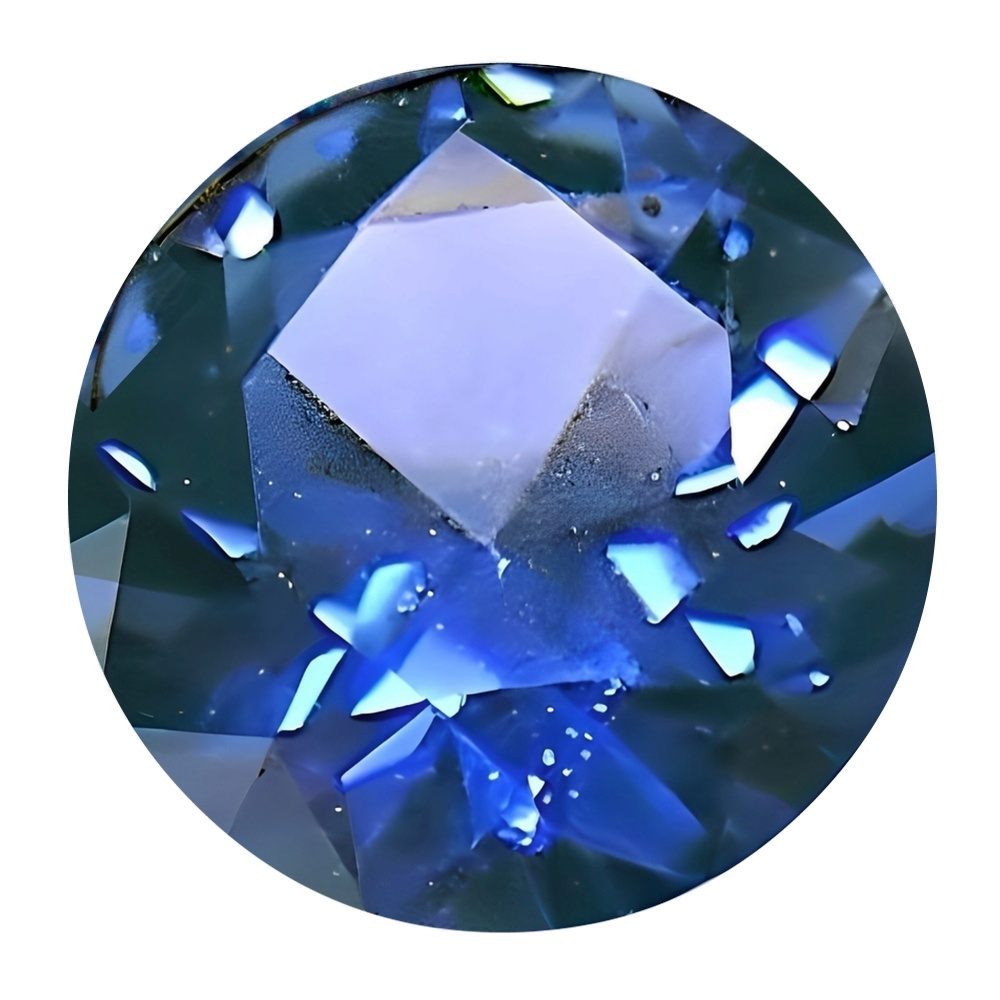
Yogo sapphire

Yogo sapphires do not need heat treating because their cornflower blue color is attractive out of the ground; they are generally free of inclusions, and have high uniform clarity. When Intergem Limited began marketing the Yogo in the 1980s as the world's only guaranteed untreated sapphire, heat treatment was not commonly disclosed; by the late 1980s, heat treatment became a major issue. At that time, much of all the world's sapphires were being heated to enhance their natural color. Intergem's marketing of guaranteed untreated Yogos set them against many in the gem industry. This issue appeared as a front-page story in The Wall Street Journal on 29 August 1984 in an article by Bill Richards, Carats and Schticks: Sapphire Marketer Upsets The Gem Industry. However, the biggest problem the Yogo mine faced was not competition from heated sapphires, but the fact that the Yogo stones could never produce quantities of sapphire above one carat after faceting. As a result, it has remained a niche product, with a market that largely exists in the US.

Lattice ('bulk') diffusion treatments are used to add impurities to the sapphire to enhance color. This process was originally developed and patented by Linde Air division of Union Carbide and involved diffusing titanium into synthetic sapphire to even out the blue color. It was later applied to natural sapphire. Today, titanium diffusion often uses a synthetic colorless sapphire base. The color layer created by titanium diffusion is extremely thin (less than 0.5 mm). Thus repolishing can and does produce slight to significant loss of color. Chromium diffusion has been attempted, but was abandoned due to the slow diffusion rates of chromium in corundum.

In the year 2000, beryllium diffused "padparadscha" colored sapphires entered the market. Typically beryllium is diffused into a sapphire under very high heat, just below the melting point of the sapphire. Initially (c. 2000) orange sapphires were created, although now the process has been advanced and many colors of sapphire are often treated with beryllium. Due to the small size of the beryllium ion, the color penetration is far greater than with titanium diffusion. In some cases, it may penetrate the entire stone. Beryllium-diffused orange sapphires may be difficult to detect, requiring advanced chemical analysis by gemological labs (e.g., Gübelin, SSEF, GIA, American Gemological Laboratories (AGL), and Lotus Gemology).

According to United States Federal Trade Commission guidelines, disclosure is required of any mode of enhancement that has a significant effect on the gem's value.

There are several ways of treating sapphire. Heat-treatment in a reducing or oxidizing atmosphere (but without the use of any other added impurities) is commonly used to improve the color of sapphires, and this process is sometimes known as "heating only" in the gem trade. In contrast, however, heat treatment combined with the deliberate addition of certain specific impurities (e.g. beryllium, titanium, iron, chromium or nickel, which are absorbed into the crystal structure of the sapphire) is also commonly performed, and this process can be known as "diffusion" in the gem trade. However, despite what the terms "heating only" and "diffusion" might suggest, both of these categories of treatment actually involve diffusion processes.

The most complete description of corundum treatments extant can be found in Chapter 6 of Ruby & Sapphire: A Gemologist's Guide (chapter authored by John Emmett, Richard Hughes and Troy R. Douthit).

== Synthetic sapphire ==
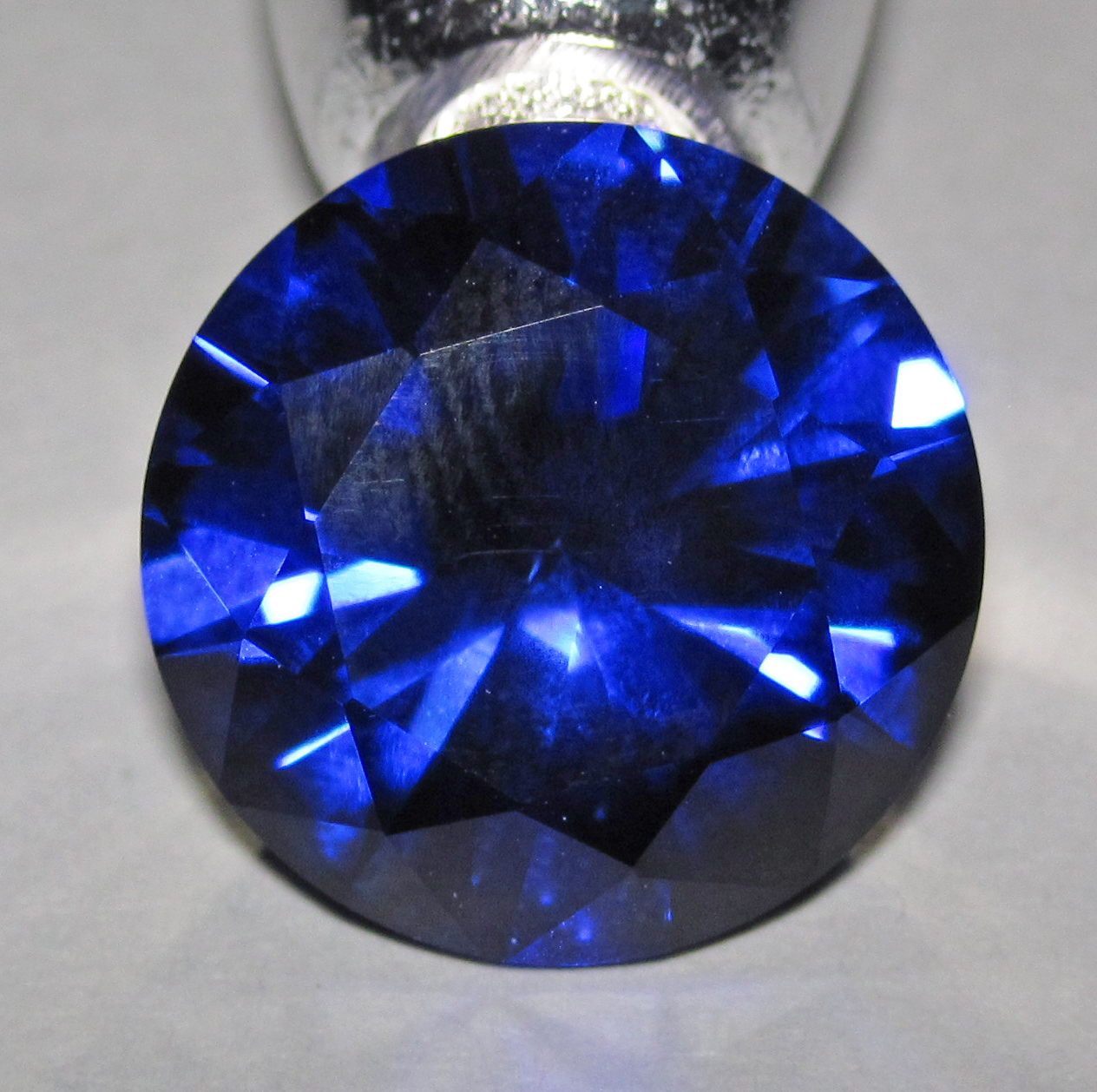
Synthetic sapphire

In 1902, the French chemist Auguste Verneuil announced a process for producing synthetic ruby crystals. In the flame-fusion (Verneuil process), fine alumina powder is added to an oxyhydrogen flame, and this is directed downward against a ceramic pedestal. Following the successful synthesis of ruby, Verneuil focused his efforts on sapphire. Synthesis of blue sapphire came in 1909, after chemical analyses of sapphire suggested to Verneuil that iron and titanium were the cause of the blue color. Verneuil patented the process of producing synthetic blue sapphire in 1911.

The key to the process is that the alumina powder does not melt as it falls through the flame. Instead it forms a sinter cone on the pedestal. When the tip of that cone reaches the hottest part of the flame, the tip melts. Thus the crystal growth is started from a tiny point, ensuring minimal strain.

Next, more oxygen is added to the flame, causing it to burn slightly hotter. This expands the growing crystal laterally. At the same time, the pedestal is lowered at the same rate that the crystal grows vertically. The alumina in the flame is slowly deposited, creating a teardrop-shaped "boule" of sapphire material. This step is continued until the desired size is reached, the flame is shut off and the crystal cools. The now elongated crystal contains a lot of strain due to the high thermal gradient between the flame and surrounding air. To release this strain, the now finger-shaped crystal will be tapped with a chisel to split it into two halves.

Due to the vertical layered growth of the crystal and the curved upper growth surface (which starts from a drop), the crystals will display curved growth lines following the top surface of the boule. This is in contrast to natural corundum crystals, which feature angular growth lines expanding from a single point and following the planar crystal faces.

=== Dopants ===
Chemical dopants can be added to create artificial versions of the ruby, and all the other natural colors of sapphire, and in addition, other colors never seen in geological samples. Artificial sapphire material is identical to natural sapphire, except it can be made without the flaws that are found in natural stones. The disadvantage of the Verneuil process is that the grown crystals have high internal strains. Many methods of manufacturing sapphire today are variations of the Czochralski process, which was invented in 1916 by Polish chemist Jan Czochralski. In this process, a tiny sapphire seed crystal is dipped into a crucible made of the precious metal iridium or molybdenum, containing molten alumina, and then slowly withdrawn upward at a rate of 1 to 100 mm per hour. The alumina crystallizes on the end, creating long carrot-shaped boules of large size up to 200 kg in mass. One popular variant of the Czochralski method is the Kyropoulos method which has the advantage of using all of the feedstock material such as aluminum oxide to create sapphire and crucibles do not have to be replaced. This is one of the main production methods for synthetic sapphire. However, the original Czochralski method can also be used.

=== Other growth methods ===
Synthetic sapphire is also produced industrially from agglomerated aluminum oxide, sintered and fused (such as by hot isostatic pressing) in an inert atmosphere, yielding a transparent but slightly porous polycrystalline product. Another popular method is the Heat Exchanger Method (HEM), in which aluminum oxide is placed in a molybdenum crucible and heated until melting at 2200°C. It allows for very large crystals over 30 cm wide to be produced. The process takes place in a vacuum. A sapphire seed crystal sits at the bottom of the crucible and is kept from melting by heat exchange (cooling) with helium gas or liquid helium which is shielded from the vacuum. The furnace is kept at a temperature just above melting, but the heat exchanger is at a temperature just below melting. Then the heat exchanger temperature is lowered to start crystalization, and then the aluminum oxide is cooled over a period of at least 72 hours to 17 days to crystalize it into sapphire. The crucibles are single use, the process is similar to the Bridgman technique and the Stöber methods for crystal growth, and was used for iPhone screens. The crystal grows upward from the bottom of the crucible. Another method is the Edge-defined Film-fed Growth (EFG) method, very similar to the Czochralski method but the material passes through a die before cooling, which shapes the crystal. The crystal does not rotate. Chemical Vapor Deposition (CVD), gradient furnace or vertical bridgman processes can be used for sapphire crystal growth.

In 2003, the world's production of synthetic sapphire was 250 tons (1.25 billion carats), mostly by the United States and Russia. The availability of cheap synthetic sapphire unlocked many industrial uses for this unique material.

=== Applications ===
==== Equipment windows ====
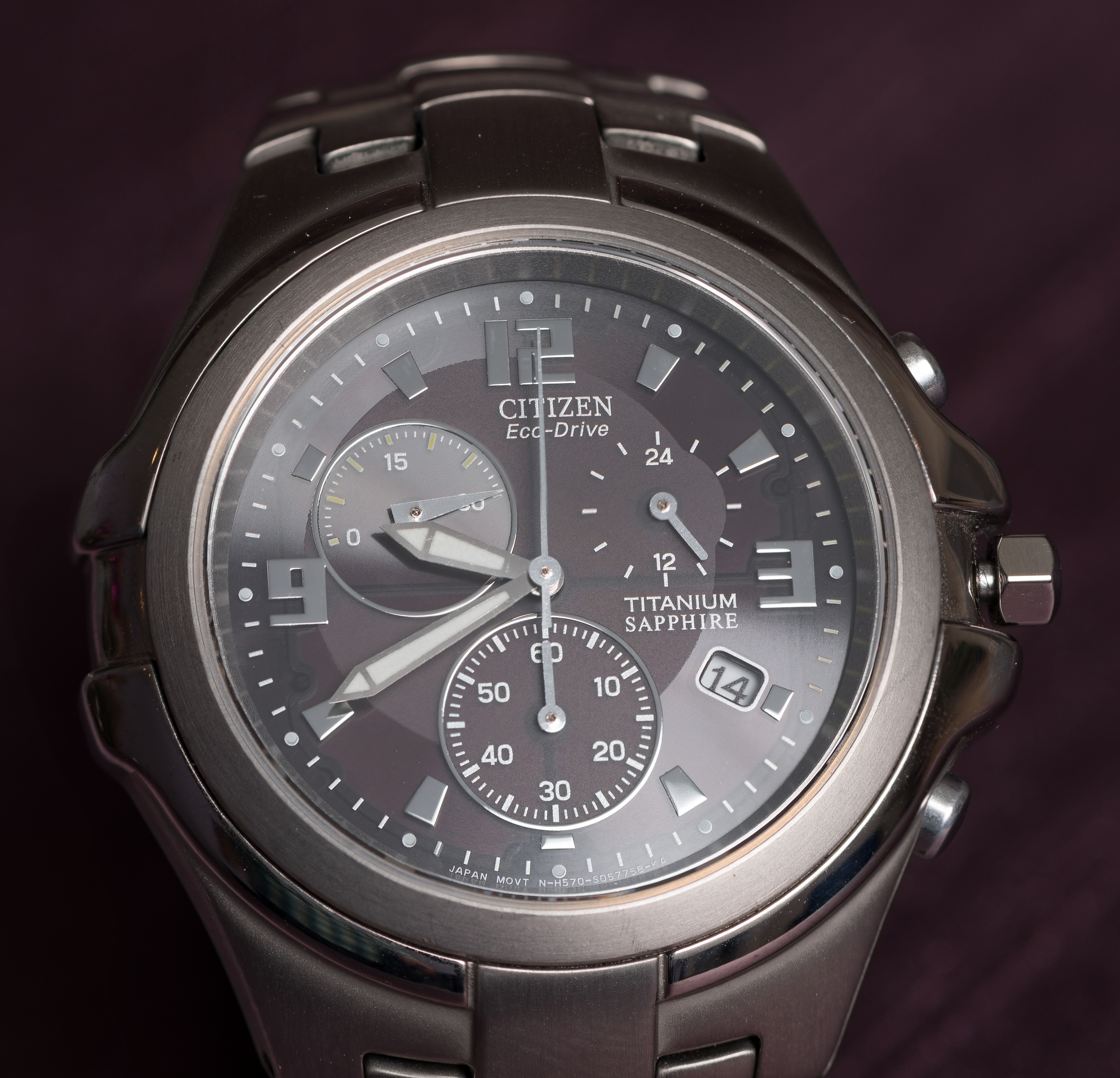
Wristwatch with synthetic sapphire watch crystal

Synthetic sapphire—also referred to as sapphire glass—is commonly used for small windows, because it is both highly transparent to wavelengths of light between 150 nm (UV) and 5500 nm (IR) (the visible spectrum extends about 380 nm to 750 nm), and extraordinarily scratch-resistant.

The key benefits of sapphire windows are:

- Very wide optical transmission band from UV to near infrared (0.15–5.5 μm)
- Significantly stronger than other optical materials or standard glass windows
- Highly resistant to scratching and abrasion (9 on the Mohs scale of mineral hardness scale, the third-hardest natural substance next to moissanite and diamonds)
- Extremely high melting temperature (2030 °C)

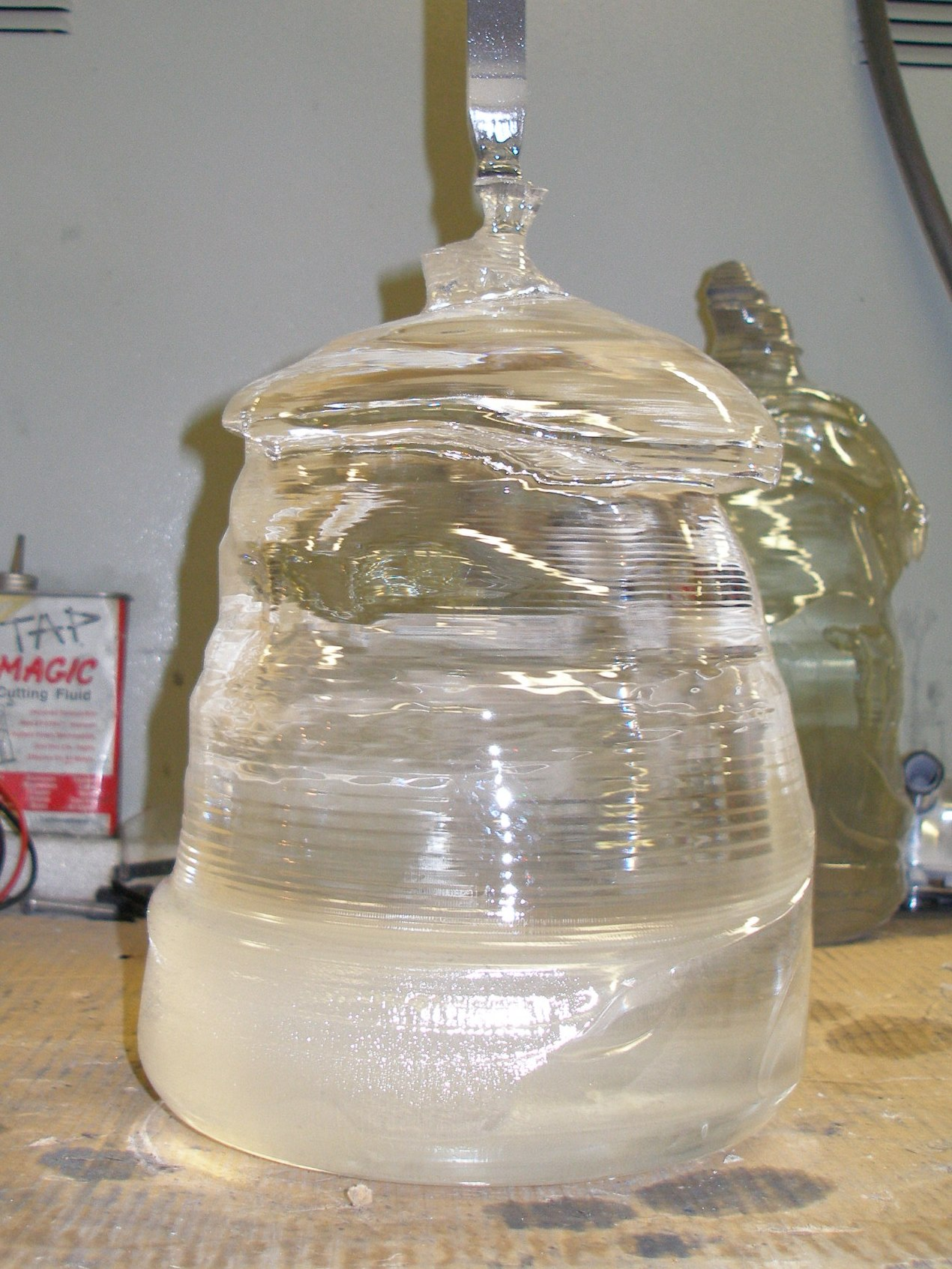
Single-crystal sapphire boule grown by the Kyropoulos method. Approximately 200 millimetres (8 in) in diameter, weighing approximately 30 kg (66 lb). (A second boule is visible in the background.)

Some sapphire-glass windows are made from pure sapphire boules that have been grown in a specific crystal orientation, typically along the optical axis, the c axis, for minimum birefringence for the application.

The boules are sliced up into the desired window thickness and finally polished to the desired surface finish. Sapphire optical windows can be polished to a wide range of surface finishes due to its crystal structure and its hardness. The surface finishes of optical windows are normally called out by the scratch-dig specifications in accordance with the globally adopted MIL-O-13830 specification.

Sapphire windows are used in both high-pressure and vacuum chambers for spectroscopy, crystals for watches, and windows in grocery-store barcode scanners, since the material's exceptional hardness and toughness makes it very resistant to scratching.

In 2014 Apple consumed "one-fourth of the world's supply of sapphire to cover the iPhone's camera lens and fingerprint reader".

Several attempts have been made to make sapphire screens for smartphones viable. Apple contracted GT Advanced Technologies, Inc. to manufacture sapphire screens for iPhones, but the venture failed, causing the bankruptcy of GTAT. The Kyocera Brigadier was the first production smartphone with a sapphire screen.

Sapphire is used for end windows on some high-powered laser tubes, as its wide-band transparency and thermal conductivity allow it to handle very high power densities in the infrared and UV spectrum without degrading due to heating.

One type of xenon arc lamp – originally called the "Cermax" and now known generically as the "ceramic-body xenon lamp" – uses sapphire crystal output windows that tolerate higher thermal loads and consequently can provide higher output powers than conventional Xe lamps with pure silica windows.

Sapphire was used for the F-35 Lightning 2 Electro Optical Targeting System window, due to its high strength.

Along with zirconia and aluminum oxynitride, synthetic sapphire is used for shatter-resistant windows in armored vehicles and various military body armor suits, in association with composites.

==== As substrate for semiconducting circuits ====
Thin sapphire wafers were the first successful use of an insulating substrate upon which to deposit silicon to make the integrated circuits known as silicon on sapphire or "SOS"; now other substrates can also be used for the class of circuits known more generally as silicon on insulator. Besides its excellent electrical insulating properties, sapphire has high thermal conductivity. CMOS chips on sapphire are especially useful for high-power radio-frequency (RF) applications such as those found in cellular telephones, public-safety band radios, and satellite communication systems. "SOS" also allows for the monolithic integration of both digital and analog circuitry all on one IC chip, and the construction of extremely low power circuits.

Wafers of single-crystal sapphire are also used in the semiconductor industry as substrates for the growth of devices based on gallium nitride (GaN). The use of sapphire significantly reduces the cost, because it has about one-seventh the cost of germanium. Gallium nitride on sapphire is commonly used in blue light-emitting diodes (LEDs).

==== In lasers ====
The first laser was made in 1960 by Theodore Maiman with a rod of synthetic ruby. Titanium-sapphire lasers are popular due to their relatively rare capacity to be tuned to various wavelengths in the red and near-infrared region of the electromagnetic spectrum. They can also be easily mode-locked. In these lasers a synthetically produced sapphire crystal with chromium or titanium impurities is irradiated with intense light from a special lamp, or another laser, to create stimulated emission.

==== In endoprostheses ====
Monocrystalline sapphire is fairly biocompatible and the exceptionally low wear of sapphire–metal pairs has led to the introduction (in Ukraine) of sapphire monocrystals for hip joint endoprostheses.

== Historical and cultural references ==
- Etymologically, the English word "sapphire" derives from French saphir, from Latin sapphirus, sappirus from Greek σαπφειρος (sappheiros) from Hebrew סַפִּיר (sapir), a term that probably originally referred to lapis lazuli, as sapphires were only discovered in Roman times.
- A traditional Hindu belief holds that the sapphire causes the planet Saturn (Shani) to be favorable to the wearer.
- During the Medieval Ages, European lapidaries came to refer to blue corundum crystal by "sapphire", a derivative of the Latin word for blue: sapphirus.
- The sapphire is the traditional gift for a 45th wedding anniversary.
- A sapphire jubilee occurs after 65 years. 2017 marked the sapphire jubilee of the accession of Queen Elizabeth II to the throne.
- The sapphire is the birthstone of September.
- An Italian superstition holds that sapphires are amulets against eye problems, and melancholy. Mary, Queen of Scots, owned a medicinal sapphire worn as a pendant to rub sore eyes.
- Pope Innocent III decreed that rings of bishops should be made of pure gold, set with an unengraved sapphire, as possessing the virtues and qualities essential to its dignified position as a seal of secrets, for there be many things "that a priest conceals from the senses of the vulgar and less intelligent; which he keeps locked up as it were under seal."
- Sapphire is the official state gem of Queensland, recognized since August 1985.

== Notable sapphires ==
Overview of notable sapphires
Sapphire	Origin	Size	Cut	Color	Location
Bismarck Sapphire	Myanmar	98.56 carats	Table	Blue	National Museum of Natural History, Washington, D.C.
Black Star of Queensland	Australia, 1938	733 carats	Star	Black	Anonymous owner
Blue Belle of Asia	Sri Lanka	392.52 carats	Cushion	Blue	Anonymous owner
Logan Sapphire	Sri Lanka	422.99 carats	Cushion	Blue	National Museum of Natural History, Washington, D.C.
Queen Marie of Romania	Sri Lanka	478.68 carats	Cushion	Blue	Anonymous owner
Star of Adam	Sri Lanka, 2015	1404.49 carats	Star	Blue	Anonymous owner
Star of Bombay	Sri Lanka	182 carats	Star	Blue-violet	National Museum of Natural History, Washington, D.C.
Star of India	Sri Lanka	563.4 carats	Star	Blue-gray	American Museum of Natural History, New York
Stuart Sapphire	Sri Lanka	104 carats		Blue	Tower of London

Extensive tables listing over a hundred important and famous rubies and sapphires can be found in Chapter 10 of Ruby & Sapphire: A Gemologist's Guide.

== See also ==
- Ruby
- Corundum
- Gemstone
- Gemology
- Emerald
- Geuda
- List of sapphires by size
