= List of individual gemstones =

A number of individual gemstones are famous in their own right, either because of their size and beauty or because of the people who owned or wore them.

== Aquamarines ==
- Dom Pedro, the world's largest cut and polished aquamarine. It is currently housed in the Janet Annenberg Hooker Hall of Geology of the National Museum of Natural History in Washington, D.C.

== Diamonds ==
See List of diamonds

== Emeralds ==
- Bahia Emerald
- Carolina Emperor, 310 carats uncut, 64.8 carats cut; discovered in the United States in 2009, resides in the North Carolina Museum of Natural Sciences, Raleigh, NC, US
- Chalk Emerald
- Duke of Devonshire Emerald
- Emerald of Saint Louis, 51.60 carats cut; discovered in Austria, probably Habachtal, resides in the National Museum of Natural History, Paris
- Gachalá Emerald
- Mogul Mughal Emerald, 217.80 carats cut; mined in Colombia and cut in the Mughal Empire in Hijri year 1107 (1695–1696), resides in the Museum of Islamic Art, Doha, Qatar
- Patricia Emerald, 632 carats uncut, dihexagonal (12 sided); discovered in Colombia in 1920, resides in the American Museum of Natural History, New York, NY, US

== Jade ==
- Jadeite Cabbage

== Jasper ==
- Meat-Shaped Stone

== Opals ==
- Andamooka Opal, presented to Queen Elizabeth II, also known as the Queen's Opal
- Flame Queen Opal
- Galaxy Opal
- Halley's Comet Opal, the world's largest uncut black opal
- Olympic Australis Opal, reported to be the largest and most valuable gem opal ever found

== Pearls ==
- Abernethy Pearl
- Arco Valley Pearl
- La Peregrina
- Pearl of Lao Tzu
- Pearl of Puerto, largest known pearl
- Servilia's pearl, most expensive pearl of all time

== Rubies ==
- DeLong Star Ruby
- Midnight Star Ruby
- Neelanjali Ruby
- Rajaratna Ruby
- Rosser Reeves Ruby

== Sapphires ==
- Black Star of Queensland
- Logan Sapphire
- Queen Marie of Romania Sapphire
- Star of Adam, with a weight of 1,404.49 carats (280.898 g), it is the largest star sapphire in the world.
- Star of Bombay, given to Mary Pickford by Douglas Fairbanks, Sr
- Star of India
- Star of Pure Land
- Stuart Sapphire

== Spinels ==
- Samarian Spinel, the world's largest spinel
- Menshikov Ruby, the world's second largest spinel set on top of the Great Imperial Crown of Russia
- Timur Ruby, believed to be a ruby until 1851, hence its name
- Black Prince's Ruby, the famous spinel mounted on the Imperial State Crown of the United Kingdom

== Topazes ==
- American Golden Topaz, the largest cut yellow topaz, weighing nearly 23,000 carats (4.6 kg).
- Chalmers Topaz, a 5,899.5-carat (1.17990 kg) cut topaz.

== Tsavorite ==
- Lion of Merelani, a square cushion cut tsavorite that weighs 116.76 carats and has 177 facets. It is on display at the Smithsonian Institution.

== Images ==
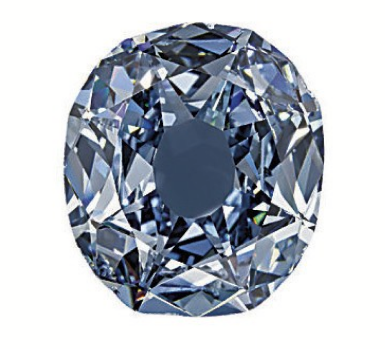
Wittelsbach-Graff Diamond

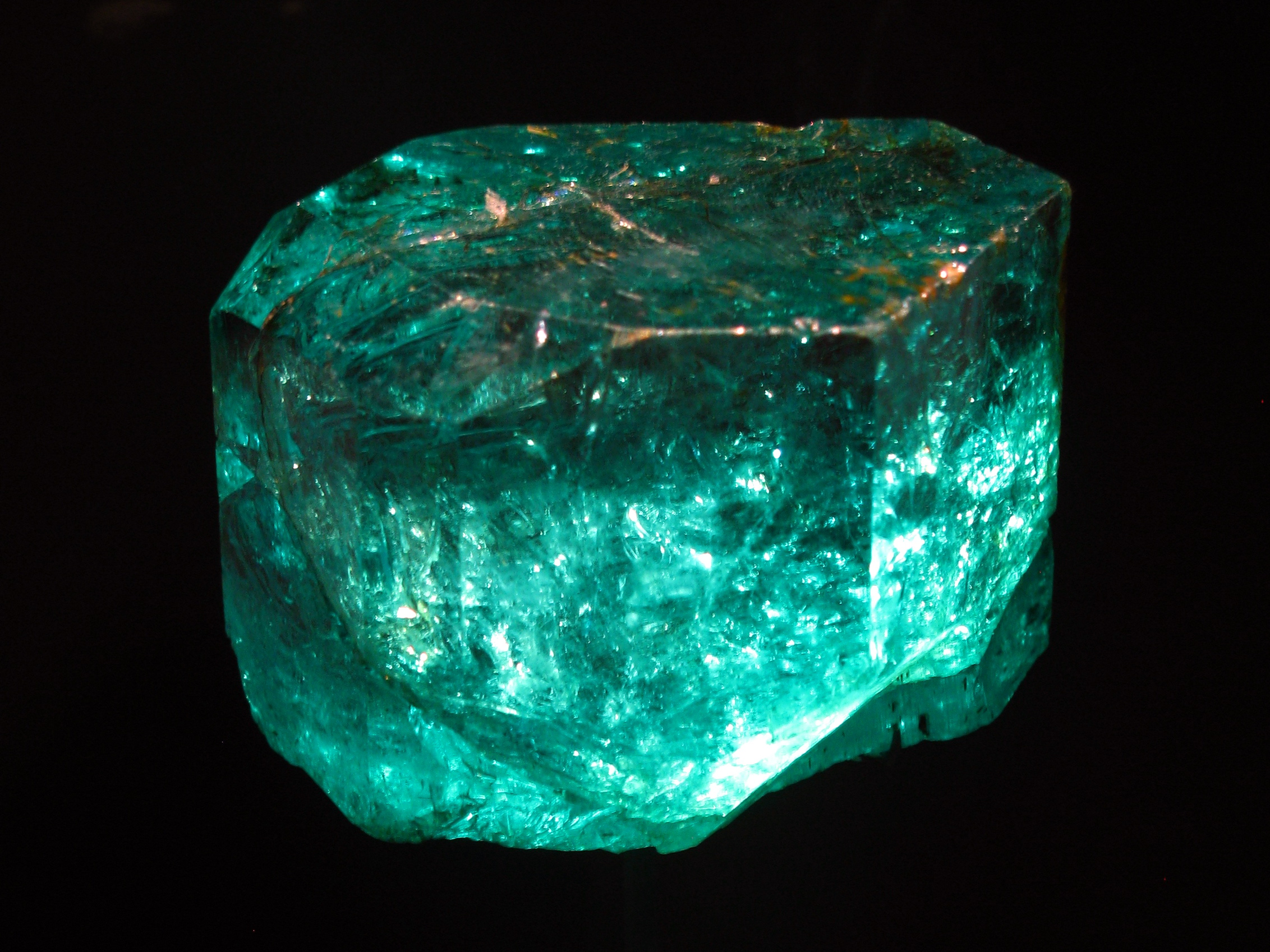
Gachalá Emerald

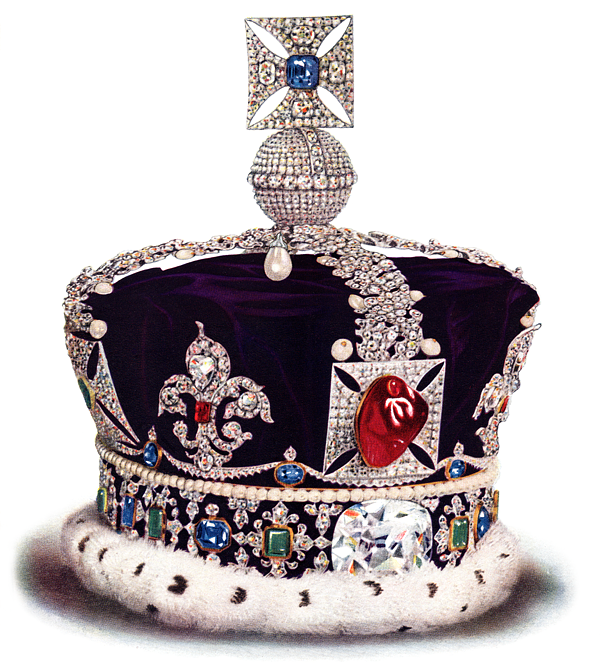
Black Prince's Ruby (front cross)

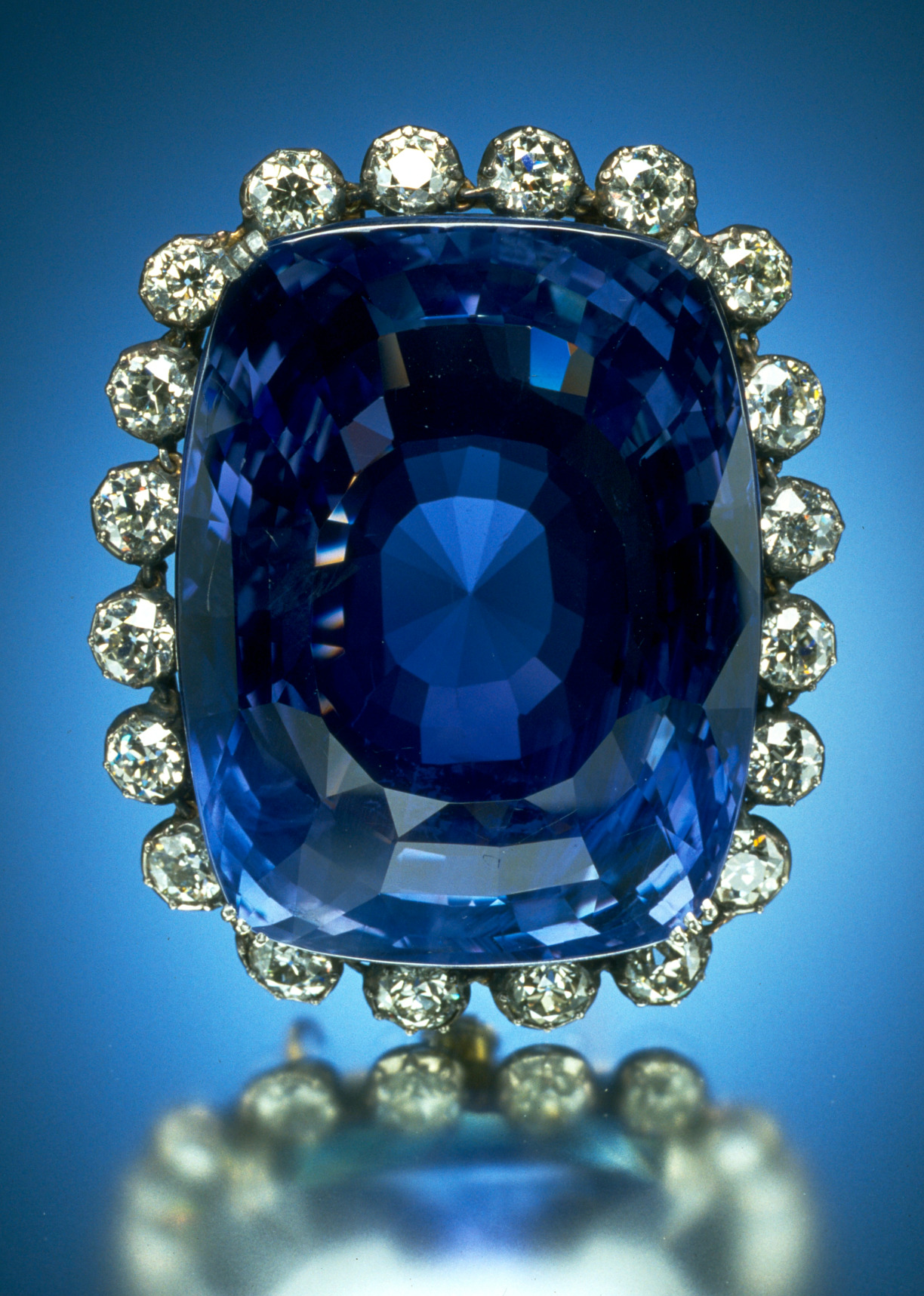
Logan Sapphire

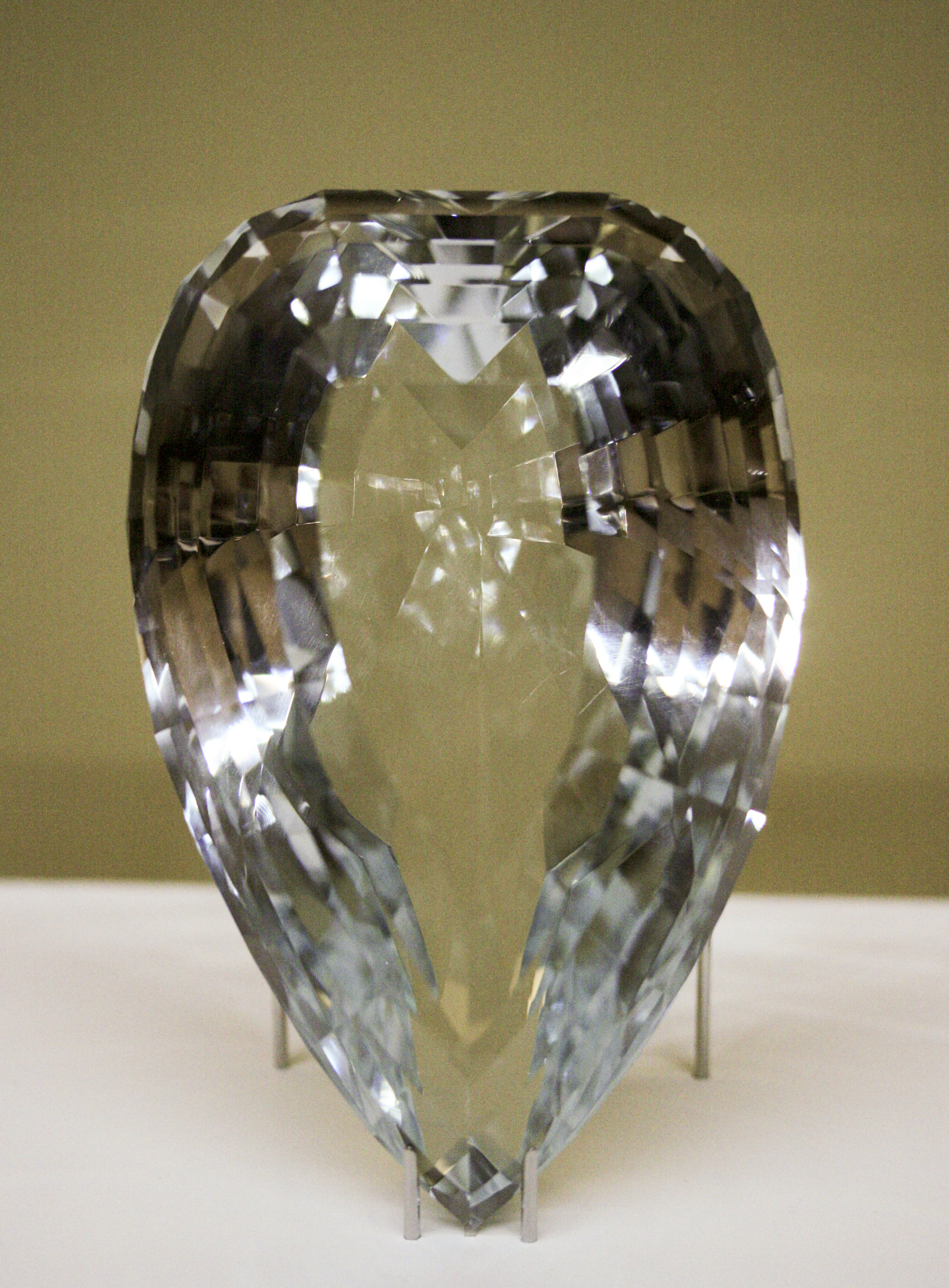
Chalmers Topaz

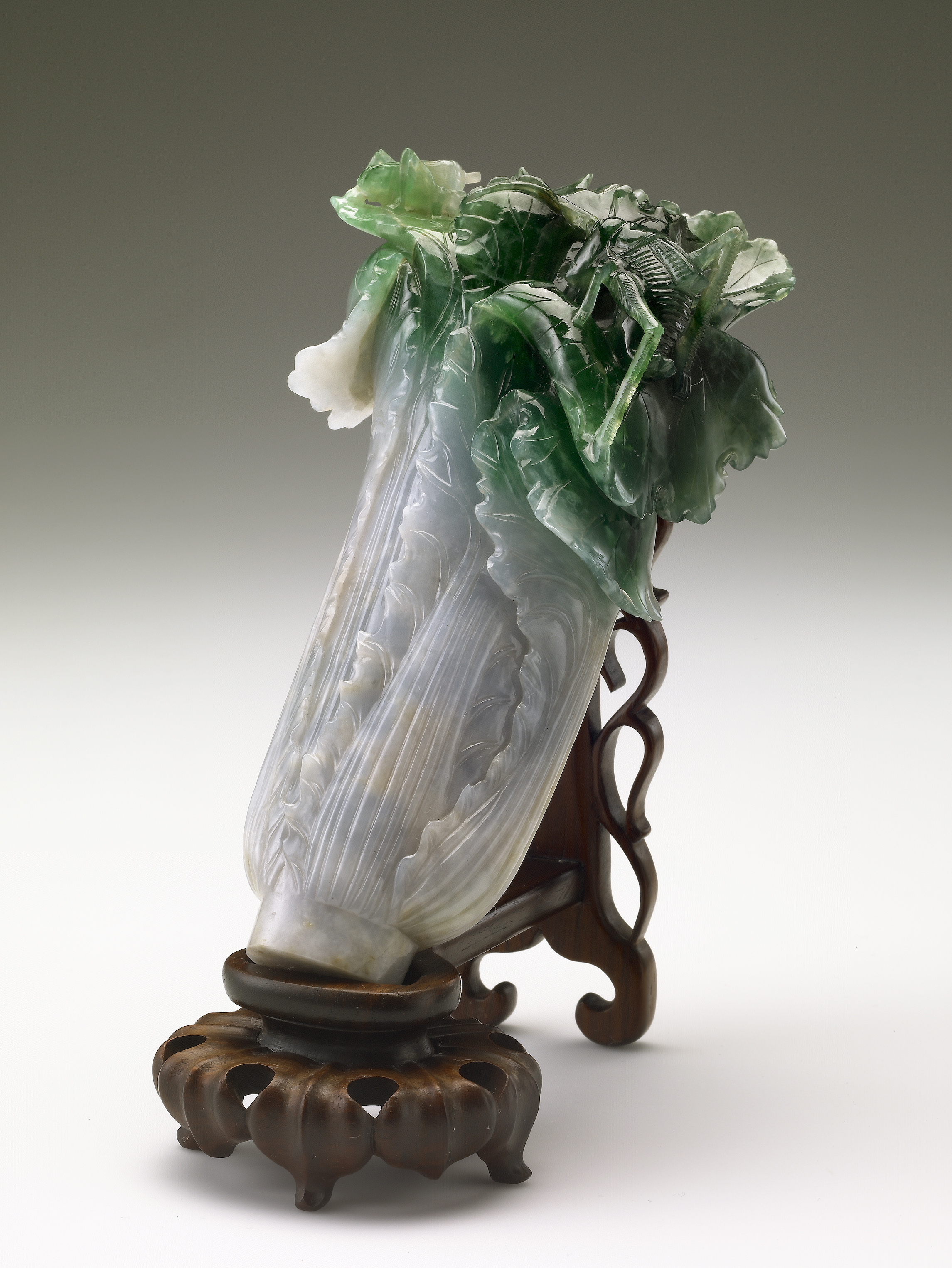
Jadeite Cabbage

== See also ==
- List of gold nuggets by size
- List of gemstones by species
- List of single-source gemstones
- List of minerals
