= Vasily Konovalenko =

Soviet artist (1929–1989)

Vasily Vasilevich Konovalenko
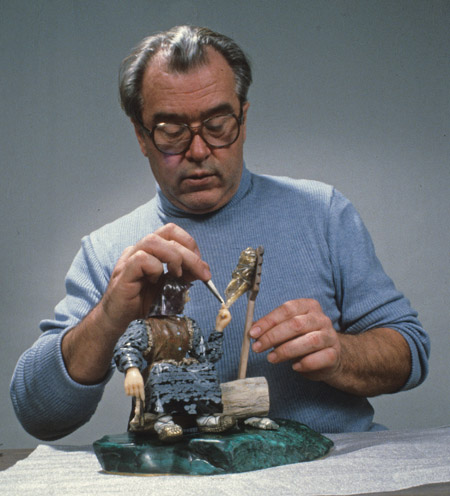
- Born: July 5, 1929; Petrovka, Ukraine
- Died: January 27, 1989 (aged 59); New York City, United States
- Education: Donetsk Polytechnic Institute
- Known for: Gem carving, sculpture, jewelry, theater set design

Vasily Vasilivich Konovalenko (Russian: Василий Васильевич Коноваленко, koʊ-noʊ-VA-ɪŋ-koʊ; 5 July 1929 – 27 January 1989) was a Soviet artist, known for creating unique three dimensional gemstone sculptures.

== Early life ==
Konovalenko was born in Petrovka, a village in east-central Ukraine on July 5, 1929 to a Ukrainian father, Basil Vasily Konovalenko (1900–1946), and a Russian mother, Galiguzova Theodosius Tikhonovna (b. 1899). He was the couple's fifth child and only son, and his documents listed him as "Ukrainian". After spending his first few years in Petrovka, the family moved to the mining center of Donetsk (which at that time was called Stalino), a larger and more cosmopolitan city in eastern Ukraine. The remainder of his childhood was spent there, with the exception of the two years of Nazi occupation, October 1941 through September 1943.

In 1944 at the age of fifteen, he began work in the Donetsk National Academic Opera and Ballet Theatre as an apprentice set designer. Between March 1944 and June 1945 he was recalled to attend a factory trade school, a so-called FZO. (At that time in the Soviet Union, attending a trade school was compulsory. ref) In 1945 he moved to the Stalino Theater for Opera and Ballet and the following year he enrolled in the art and architecture school at Donetsk Polytechnic Institute where he received specialized training.

Between March 1949 and January 1950, Konovalenko worked in sculpture at the Stalino Regional Association of Artists. In October 1950 Konovalenko was drafted into the Soviet navy but he was discharged only five months later due to unspecified and unrecorded medical reasons. At some point during this service, he visited Leningrad (now St. Petersburg) and he was taken by the artistic, historic and cultural environment of the city and he perceived career opportunities there. Shortly after his military discharge, he moved to Leningrad and he found employment with the prestigious Mariinsky Theater, then the Kirov State Academic Theatre of Opera and Ballet (Государственный академический театр оперы и балета имени С.М. Кирова). Konovalenko's engagement with the Mariinsky launched him on the path of his life's work.

== The Tale of the Stone Flower ==
On April 25, 1957, the Mariinsky Theater opened Sergei Prokofiev's eighth and final ballet, The Tale of the Stone Flower, for which Konovalenko served as the lead set designer. (The Tale of the Stone Flower was premiered in 1954 by the Bolshoi Theater. The production proved to be a public disappointment and it was not produced again for another five years.) Among Konovalenko's many tasks for the production was the creation of a large malachite box as a prop. At this point he was not known as a gem carver but he had had sculptural experience as far back as his apprenticeship at the Donetsk National Theater. With the malachite box, Konovaleko would find his life's calling.

The Tale of the Stone Flower is based on the Russian Ural folk tale The Stone Flower by Pavel Bazhov. Briefly, the story takes place in the Ural Mountains of central Russia. The male lead, young Danilo, is engaged to the beautiful Katarina. Unfortunately the Mistress of Malachite Mountain tempts Danilo with a legendary stone flower. As a gem carver himself, Danilo becomes entranced with the stone flower and he sets out to make one of his own out of the beautiful black- and green-banded mineral malachite. In the process, Danilo becomes entranced with the Mistress of Malachite Mountain. After a long period in which Danilo developed extraordinary gem carving skills, he again professes his love for Katarina. Appreciating Danilo's honesty and loyalty, the Mistress of Malachite Mountain blesses the reunion. The blessed couple live happily ever after and Danilo becomes an extraordinary gem carver.

Konovalenko continued to work at the Mariinsky Theater for the next 16 years but at the same time he continued to hone his gem carving skills. Many of his pieces from this period are on display at the State Gemstone Museum in Moscow. During this period he also traveled extensively to visit mineral sources in the Urals, Siberia and Ukraine and to meet with geologists and mineralogists.

== The State Russian Museum Exhibition ==
By 1971, Konovalenko's theatrical reputation was at its zenith, but his gem carving reputation was lagging because he had never had a public exhibition. Vasily's wife, Anna, decided that Vasily should be the focus of such an exhibition and that they should try to meet with authorities in Moscow toward this end. This was a bold approach, considering that they had no letter of introduction from party officials in Leningrad. That was bad enough but in addition the example of Vasily's work that they chose to present was an early version of Bosom Pals (Brazhniki), a rather ill-advised choice as it depicted three men carousing, definitely not the Soviet Realism style then favored by the Communist Party. Anna and Vasily were summarily dismissed and they returned to Leningrad, rejected but unscathed.

Two years later the couple decided to make a second approach and they returned to Moscow better prepared. Through mutual acquaintances, Anna obtained a meeting with Sergey Mikhalkov, a well-known and well-connected author. (Also the author of the lyrics of the Soviet national anthem.) They also brought two more-appropriate works, Warrior and The Tsar's Henchman. The meeting was a complete success — Mikhalkov loved the sculptures and he immediately contacted Mikhail Solomentsev, chairman of the Council of Ministers. Solomentsev also loved the pieces and within minutes he decided that an exhibition should be arranged and that it should be at the State Russian Museum in Leningrad. Solomentsev's position in the hierarchy was such that once he voiced his approval, everyone fell into line. An additional stroke of good luck was that the director of the State Russian Museum, Vasily Pushkarev, knew and admired Konovalenko's work.

At the end of 1973, ten sculptures, created between 1959 and 1973, went on display at the State Russian Museum. The exhibition was an unmitigated success. Within a week of the exhibition's opening, some 25,000 copies of the exhibit catalog were sold. The pieces in the exhibition included:

• Bosom Pals (Brazhniki) (1953)

• Fishing (1965)

• Grandma and Grandpa (1963)

• Ice Fishing (1968)

• Organ Grinder" (1967)

• Tea Drinker (1971)

• Tsar's Henchman (1970)

• Warrior (1961)

• Welcome (1959)

• Zemfira (1973)

== Persecution ==
Unfortunately, by approaching the authorities in Moscow, who in turn worked directly with Pushkarev at the State Russian Museum, the Konovalenkos bypassed local officials in Leningrad, most notably Grigory Romanov, the most powerful Communist Party official in Leningrad. The Konovalenkos had inserted themselves in the middle of a long-simmering power struggle between Puskkarev and Romanov. Having been bypassed, Romanov was denied the opportunity to share the credit for the exhibition. One outward sign of his displeasure was that, even though he had been sent a special invitation to the exhibition, he did not attend. Romanov devised a plan to charge Konovalenko as a criminal, in spite of the fact that he had just been heralded as a national hero, and he engaged the KGB to investigate Konovalenko.

According to the letter of the law, Konovalenko was indeed guilty of three laws: he had been involved in buying and selling precious and semi-precious stones; if one were to take a cynical view, he had denigrated Soviet culture by the whimsical nature of his characters; and he was in possession of gold and silver. The KGB investigation was terrifying for the Konovalenkos. Some 1,500 friends, associates and acquaintances of Konovalenko were interviewed in trying to gather evidence against him. Their house and workshop were damaged in a 12-hour long search.

The Konovalenkos had friends working behind-the-scenes to keep him out of prison and a compromise was eventually reached. He agreed to "donate" all 10 of the sculptures in the exhibit to the Soviet state, to move his family from Leningrad to Moscow, and to take employment there in the State "Samotsvety" (Gems) Museum. Ironically, at the same time, the American Armand Hammer offered to purchase the ten pieces in the exhibit for $150,000 each. Party officials declined the offer and the pieces are still today in the "Samotsvety" in Moscow. When the KGB investigation reached the desk of the Chief Prosecutor of the Soviet Union, he dismissed the case as being "cartoonish".

The Konovalenko's, however, began to fear that, if this had happened once, it could well happen again and they began to seriously consider finding a way to leave the Soviet Union.

== Exodus ==
In 1974 at the "Samotsvety", Konovalenko began working as the director of the newly formed Laboratory of Small Sculptural Forms. Unfortunately he soon discovered that much of his work would consist of making pieces for Communist Party officials to offer as gifts to colleagues and friends. So in spite of the seemingly stable employment and living situations, he was not free as an artist and he realized that likely he never would be. The ultimate solution would be to emigrate from the Soviet Union, but Konovalenko himself had no basis for applying for an exit visa. However between 1966 and 1982, there was a mechanism for Jews to leave and Vasily's wife/widow was/is Jewish. The family applied under this program and in February 1981, their emigration visas arrived.

Vasily was on an airplane headed to Vienna the following day and the rest of the family followed him about two weeks later. The official intent of the Jewish emigration program was for emigres to go to Israel, but Anna's brother lived in New York City and it was decided that economic and artistic opportunities would be greater there. The family arrived in New York in April 1981.

== Life in the United States ==
Several years earlier in Moscow, Konovalenko had met Raphael Gregorian, a Russian-born medical supplies dealer and he was the first person the Konovalenkos contacted in search of support. Through Gregorian, diamond dealers Michael Kazanjian and Jack Ortman were introduced to Konovalenko and the three agreed to sponsor him.

The contract that was drawn up called for Konovalenko to produce 18 works in two years. Still, there remained a gap in the plan - the display and permanent disposition of the pieces. Among Ortman's list of clients was Alvin Cohen, a Denver-based construction magnate, who was a trustee of the Denver Museum of Nature and Science. He was in the position to solve the remaining issue. Through the first half of 1983 plans were formulated for an exhibition to open in Denver on November 2 of that year.

There was however, a very unfortunate turn of events on September 1, 1983, when Soviet Air Force fighter jets shot down Korean Air Lines Flight 007 (KAL 007), a passenger airline en route from New York to Seoul. This was obviously a serious problem for the exhibition — an exhibition of Russian art produced by a Russian immigrant. A decision was made to delay the opening by some four months.

The Konovalenko sculptures went on display for the first time outside of the Soviet Union on March 15, 1984 to great acclaim. Included were Barrel Bath; Bosom Pals; Hunter on the Mark; Ice Fishing; In the Sultry Afternoon I; In the Sultry Afternoon II; Laundress; Mower; On the Stroll; Painter; Prisoners; Spring; Sauna I: The Thin and the Fat; Sauna II: Woman; Toper; Walruses and Wanderer (or Old Believer). Swan Song had broken en route and had to be virtually recreated from scratch.

Surprisingly, no one had given much thought to the disposition of the pieces following the exhibition. Given the popularity of the exhibition, the default solution was to simply extend the display and that was done incrementally until 1989. Several pieces were added — Grandmother; Bread and Salt and Gold Prospectors. Hunter on the Mark was moved to a private collection. As the years passed, thought was given to how the collection might be made permanent at the Museum.

Ortman had purchased the subscriptions of Kazanjian and Gregorian in 1984 and Cohen bought the entire collection from Ortman in 1989. Cohen subsequently donated all 20 pieces to the Denver Museum of Nature and Science Foundation in 1999.

Vasily Konovalenko died on January 27, 1989, five days after suffering a cerebral hemorrhage. Konovalenko is buried in the cemetery of the Russian Orthodox Convent 'Novo Diveevo' in Nanuet, New York.

== The Denver Museum of Nature and Science Collection ==
The Denver Museum of Nature and Science has far and away the largest public display of Konovalenko's sculptures in the world — 20 pieces. They include:

•Barrel Bath: An elderly man is enjoying a hot bath in a barrel, enveloped in a large towel or rug. Materials: Beloretsk quartz, agate, cacholong, red jasper, petrified wood, gold-plated silver, silver, sapphire and cloisonné. Height 22 cm.

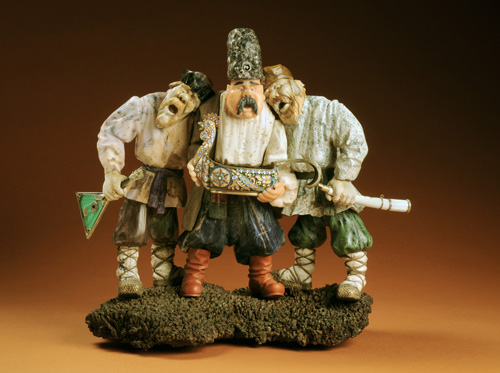
Bosom Pals

• Bosom Pals: Three revelers singing boisterously. Two of the men hold instruments-a horn and a balalaika-and the third a punchbowl. Materials: Beloretsk quartz, jasper, green jasper, diamond, ruby, tiger eye, nephrite, rose agate, cacholong, gold, silver, gold-plated silver and cloisonné. Height 28 cm.

•Bread and Salt: An elderly man receiving guests with the traditional offering of bread and rock salt. Materials: Beloretsk quartz, white quartz, gray quartz, jasper, banded jasper, jade, banded onyx, calcite nodule, gold-plated silver, sapphire, opal and cloisonné. Height 27 cm.

•Gold Prospectors: Two prospectors and a burro, the only sculpture Konovalenko ever made with an American theme. The original clay model for this piece is in the DMNS collections. Materials: Beloretsk quartz, agate, Indian agate, jade, tourmaline, gold-plated silver, silver, sapphire, zebra jasper, jasper conglomerate, horn, dinosaur bone (fossil), sodalite, septarian calcite, cacholong, ruby and petrified wood. Height 34 cm.

•Grandmother: An elderly woman, seated outside, spinning wool. Materials: Beloretsk quartz, white quartz, rutilated quartz, amethyst, snowflake obsidian, jasper, aragonite, malachite, gold and petrified wood. Height 34 cm.

•Ice Fishing: A middle-aged man enjoying a winter day on a frozen lake. Materials: Beloretsk quartz, rutilated quartz, obsidian, tiger eye, agate, lapis lazuli, ruby, petrified wood, jasper, gold, silver, labradorite, serdolic agate and nundoorite. Height 24 cm.

•In the Sultry Afternoon I: An obese man gorges on watermelon while enjoying a cool soak on a hot afternoon. Materials: Beloretsk quartz, jasper, ruby, sapphire, agate, petrified wood, gold-plated silver and silver. Height 18 cm.

•In the Sultry Afternoon II: A buxom woman enjoys a cup of tea while soaking in a pool. Materials: Beloretsk quartz, rutilated quartz, sapphire, agate, cacholong, turquoise, lapis lazuli, gold-plated silver and cloisonné. Height 23 cm.

•Laundress: A woman is engaged in the mundane task of washing clothes. Materials: Beloretsk quartz, sapphire, agate, variscite, white jasper, pearl, malachite, pyrite, petrified wood, amethyst, aventurine and (goldstone). Height 12 cm.

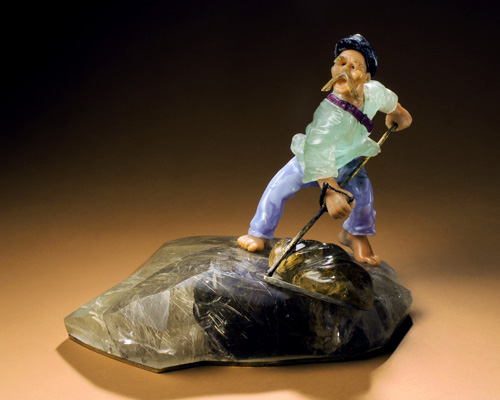
Mower

• Mower: A man working a scythe in a rye field. Materials: Beloretsk quartz, rutilated quartz, black jasper, sapphire, agate, ruby, obsidian, snowflake obsidian, beryl, gold, silver, gold-plated silver and gold plate. Height 23 cm.

•On the Stroll: A couple strolling together, the young woman playing a balalaika and singing. Materials: Beloretsk quartz, chalcopyrite, sapphire, red jasper, white jasper, variscite, nundoorite, opal, lapis lazuli, onyx, goldstone, sapphire, gold and agate. Height 30 cm.

•Painter: A forlorn, yet proud drunk house painter. Materials: Jasper, black jasper, white jasper, sapphire, amethyst, quartz, snowflake obsidian, lapis lazuli, petrified wood and cacholong. Height 25 cm.

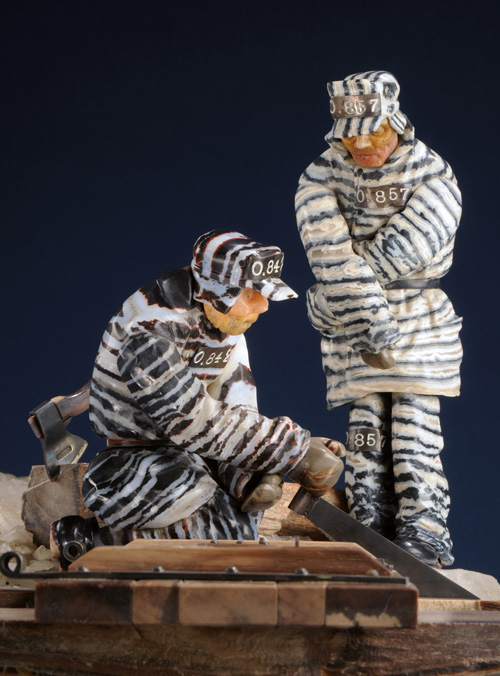
Prisoners detail

• Prisoners: Two prisoners building their shelter in a Siberian labor camp. Materials: Beloretsk quartz, ice quartz, jasper, zebra jasper, petrified wood, ruby, silver, sapphire and obsidian. Height 32 cm.

•Sauna I: The Thin and the Fat": A thin masseuse struggling with the literal and metaphorical weight of his overstuffed client. Materials: Beloretsk quartz, rose quartz, agate, obsidian, tiger eye, calcite, mahogany obsidian, petrified wood and cacholong. Height 24 cm.

•Sauna II: Woman: A woman of some leisure being pummeled with birch switches by a working class attendant. Materials: Beloretsk quartz, rose quartz, rutilated quartz, sapphire, agate, obsidian, jasper, aventurine, silver, gold-plated silver and petrified wood. Height 34 cm.

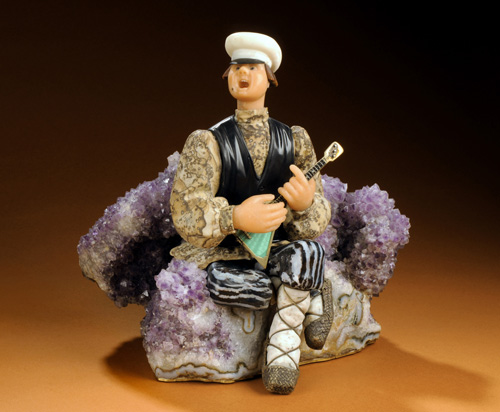
Spring

• Spring: A dapper young man singing and playing a balalaika. Materials: Beloretsk quartz, cacholong, zebra jasper, jasper, sapphire, obsidian, gold-plated silver, tiger eye and cloisonné. Height 25 cm.

•Swan Song: A bow hunter posing with the swan he has just killed. Materials: Beloretsk quartz, sodalite, tiger eye, red jasper, black jasper, obsidian, ruby, pyrite, sapphire, cacholong, gold and serdolic agate. Height 35 cm.

•The Toper:A Russian drunkard emptying the last drops of vodka into his mouth. Materials: Beloretsk quartz, quartz, gold-plated quartz, kalkanskaya jasper, blue jasper, ruby, malachite, tiger eye, silver, serdolic agate, sapphire, obsidian, agate and cacholong. Height 35 cm.

•Walruses: A couple "enjoying" a plunge into an icy pool. Materials: Beloretsk quartz, jasper, agate, calcite, obsidian, aventurine, jasper, rhodonite, silver and gold-plated silver. Height 24 cm.

•Wanderer (Old Believer): A member of a fundamentalist religious group, known as the Old Believers, that split from the traditional Russian Orthodox Church around 1660. Materials: Beloretsk quartz, rutilated quartz, cacholong or Kalmuck agate, amethyst, turquoise, malachite, red- and black-banded jasper, gold and gold-plated silver. Height 34 cm.

== The 1988 exhibition in Colorado Springs, Colorado ==
There was an exhibition of six pieces in the Colorado Springs Pioneers Museum in Colorado Springs, Colorado. Included in the exhibit were Balalaika Player I, Fisherman I, Fisherman II, Ice Fisherman, Merchant and Tea for One.

== The 2016 "Vasily Konovalenko: A Sculptor of Gems" Exhibit ==
Between June 1 and August 31, 2016 the first ever international exhibition of Konovalenko's work was held in the One-Pillar Chamber of the Patriarch’s Palace, The Kremlin, Moscow, Russia. The exhibition included forty works in gems, bronze, silver and enamel from numerous sources around the world. In addition there were more than forty graphic works, including theatric set designs, sketches for jewelry and gem-carving sculptures. Works from both his Soviet and American years were included.

Items were lent to the exhibition from the Moscow Kremlin Museums, the Museum "Samotsvety" (Moscow), the Russian State Precious Metals and Gems Repository (Moscow), the Denver Museum of Nature and Science (Colorado, USA), the Kazanjian Foundation and private collectors in the United States.

== See also ==
- Denver Museum of Nature and Science
- The Tale of the Stone Flower (Prokofiev)
