= Menilite =

Form of opal

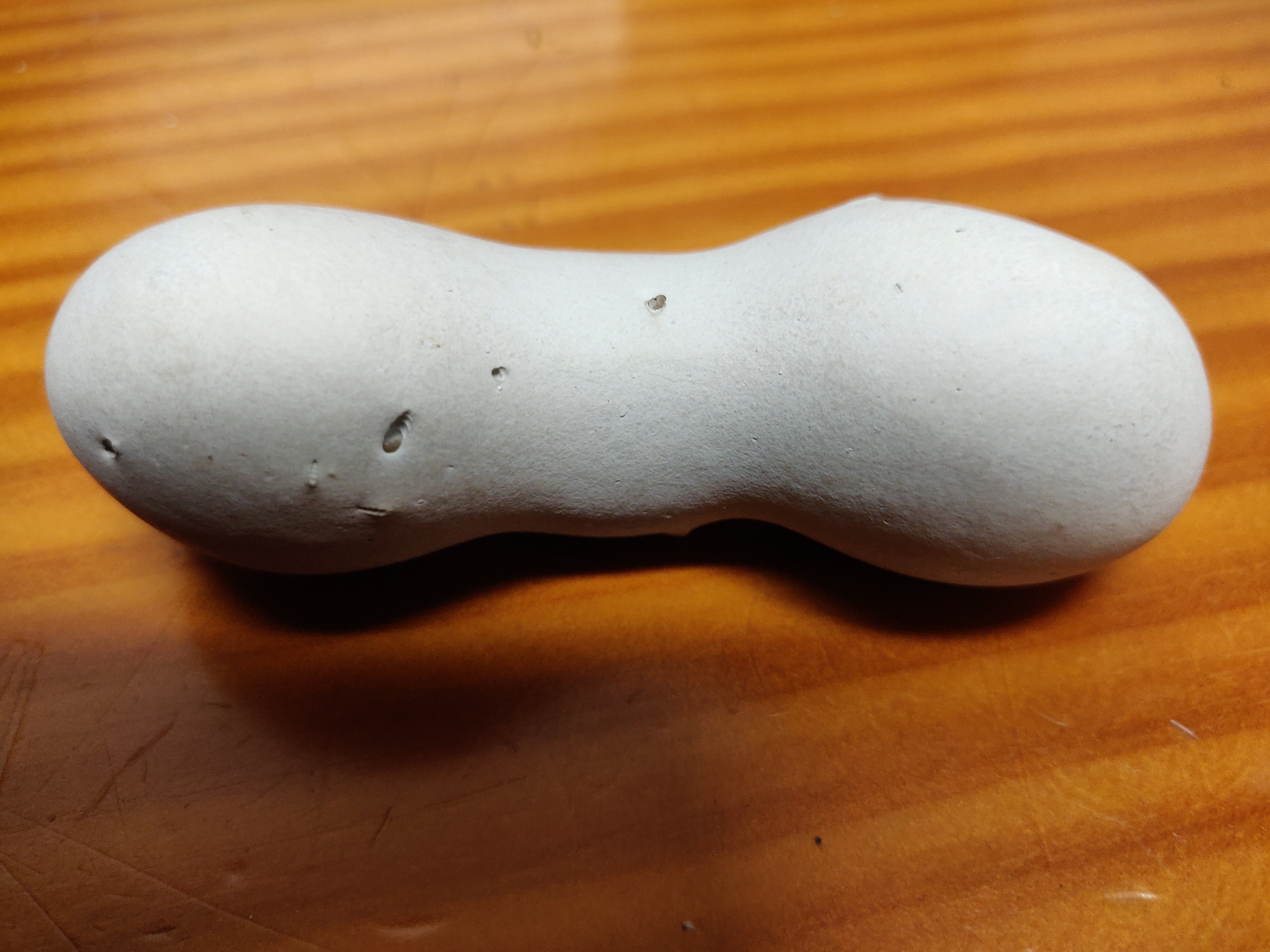
Menilite

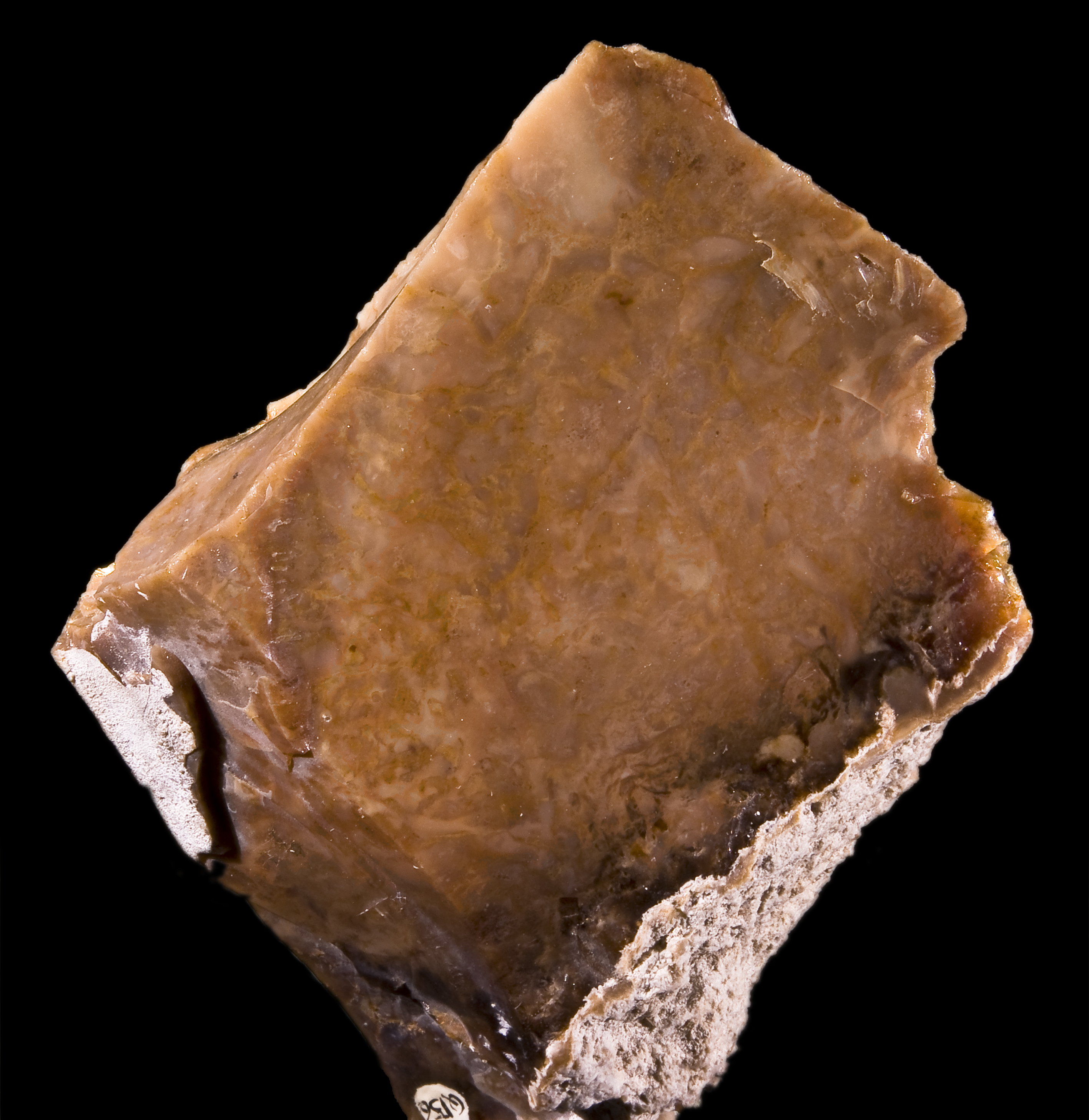
Menilite

Menilite is a greyish-brown form of the mineraloid opal. It is also known as liver opal or leberopal (German), due to its color. It is called menilite because it was first described from Ménilmontant (Paris), France, where it occurs as concretions within bituminous Early Oligocene Menilite Shales.

== See also ==
- Geyserite
- Hyalite
