= Doublet (lapidary) =

Gem made up of two sections

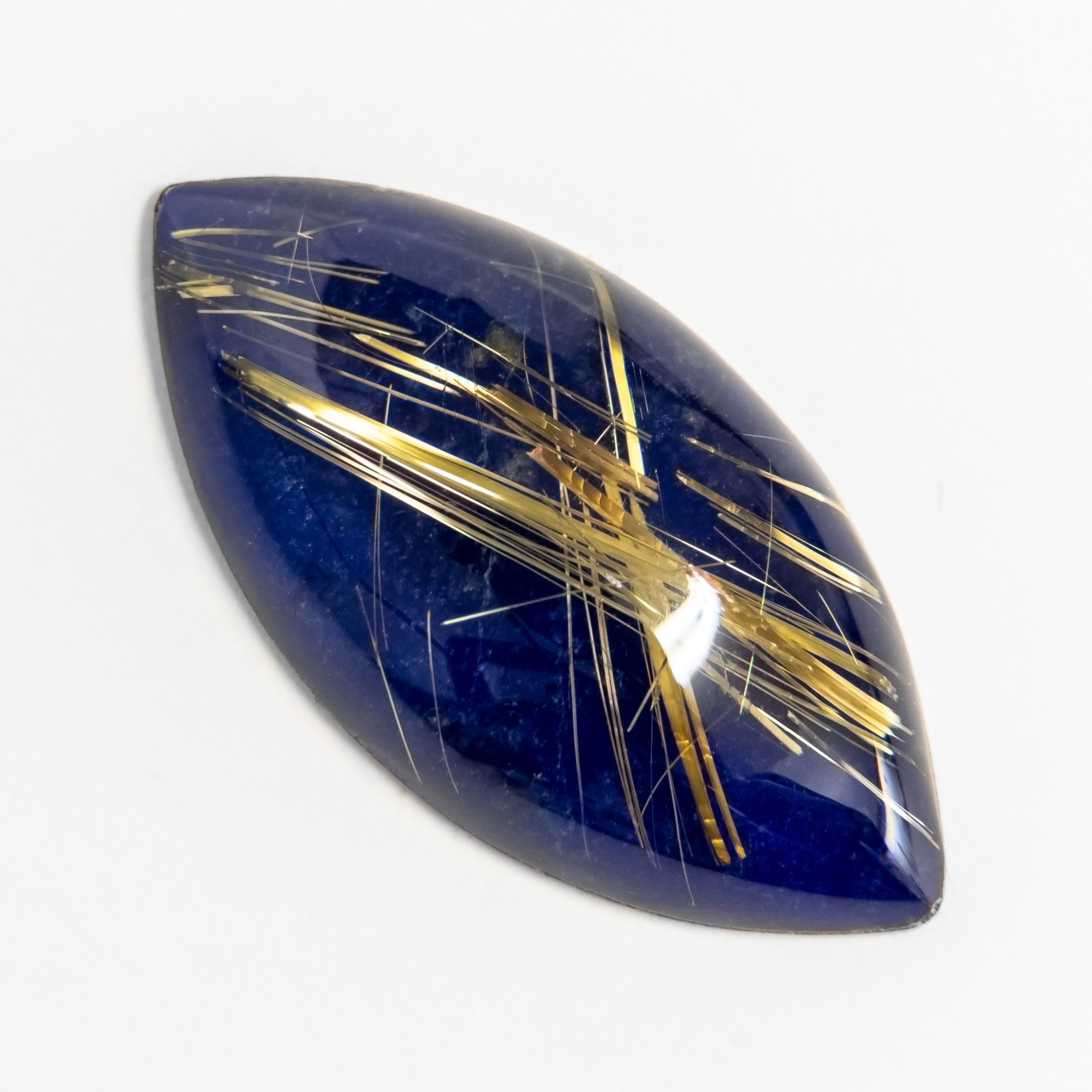
Navette doublet cabochon with rutilated quartz top and lapis lazuli bottom.

A doublet is a type of assembled gem composed of two horizontal sections. It is sometimes used to imitate other, more expensive gems.

A garnet and glass doublet uses a top portion of natural garnet fused to any color of glass to imitate a gem. The color of glass used in the doublet is all that is seen, as the garnet provides no color. If seen in reflected light, a separation line may be seen. A harder garnet makes the stones more durable. In the case of opal doublets, a backing layer of onyx or matrix (ironstone) gives the more fragile opal layer support and can make the opal look darker and higher quality.

Garnet and glass doublets were first used around 1850 when it was noted that molten glass would adhere to garnet. It was a popular imitation for all types of gems in many colors because the color of the glass became the only color that could be seen. They were still being produced into the early 1900s until actual synthetic gems were introduced.
