= Assembled gem =

Gemstone made up of other gems

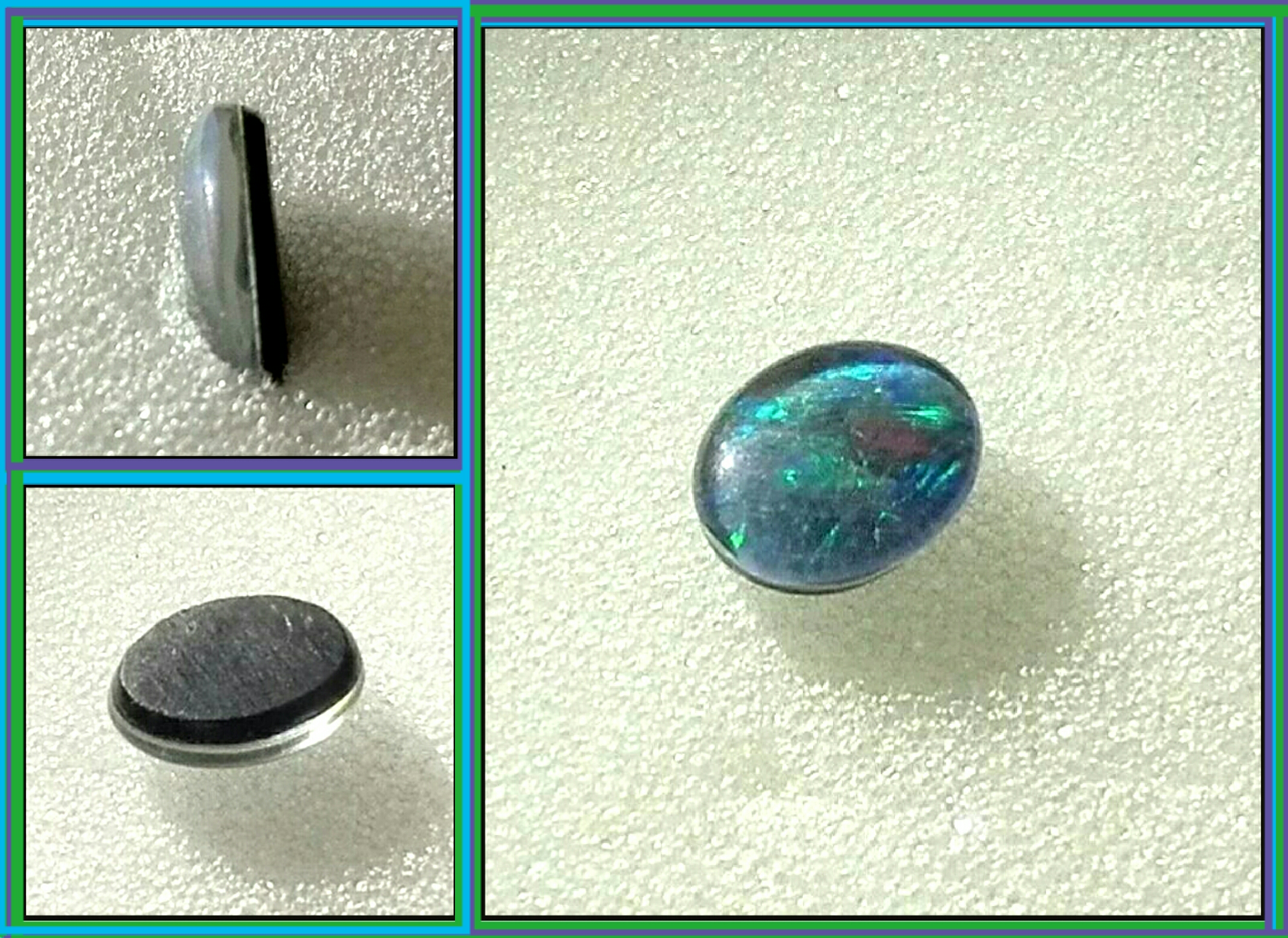
Opal triplet: A thin slice of opal between a top or rock crystal and a bottom of agate.

An assembled gem (also called a composite gem) is a gemstone made up of other smaller gems. An assembled gem can often be a fake gem with a desirable piece of gemstone attached to pieces of inexpensive imitation gemstones. For example, a combination of a thin layer of green glass and a colorless piece of quartz would be a composite gem.

== Types ==
A doublet is a type of assembled gem which is composed of two parts. A false doublet is a doublet which is a glass piece that looks like a real gem and a real gem that have been attached to look like a larger gem. A triplet is a type of assembled gem composed of three distinct parts.
