= Foil opal =

Foil opals are simulated opal gemstones that first came into vogue during the jewelry-making boom of the late-Victorian era. Across Europe and the United States, these faux gemstones joined their paste counterparts (simulated diamonds, emeralds, rubies and sapphires made from glass) as the need for jewelry outstripped both gemstone availability and nouveau middle-class budgets. The term 'foil' refers to an actual metal foil that was sometimes used to create reflection and sparkle behind milky glass or quartz faces. Though technically incorrect, other simulated opals with various types of sparkling inclusions or shiny backings are sometimes also referred to as 'foil opals' by jewelry collectors.

== See also ==
- Cacholong
- Synthetic gemstones
