= Fiorite =

Form of opal

General
- Category: Mineraloid
- Formula: SiO_{2}·nH_{2}O

Identification
- Crystal habit: Globular, botryoidal, or stalactic
- Fracture: Conchoidal
- Luster: Pearly

Fiorite is a hydrated silica mineraloid, a form of opal, found in cavities in volcanic tuff. It is a globular, botryoidal, or stalactic concretionary form of opal. The mineraloid has a pearly lustre and forms botryoidal masses. Named after Santa Fiora, Italy, fiorite is used as a gemstone.

== See also ==
- Geyserite
