= Fire of Australia opal =

998 gram uncut opal mined in South Australia

The Fire of Australia opal is a 998 gram uncut opal mined by Walter Bartram in 1946 at the Eight Mile field in Coober Pedy, South Australia.

== Overview ==
The opal is just under 5,000 carats; roughly equivalent in size to two cricket balls. Although rough-cut, it is polished on two sides.

Due to the evaporation of an inland sea several million years ago, South Australia is one of the few places on Earth where opals of this size can be created. Around ninety percent of the world's opals are found in South Australia.

== Ownership ==
After its discovery in 1946, the opal remained in Bartram's family until 2017, when it was sold to the South Australian Museum. The opal was sold for A$500,000, despite its estimated market value of A$900,000, to ensure that it remained uncut.

Bartram was determined that the opal remain in Australia, turning down higher offers from overseas buyers to ensure this. "It is such a piece, so outstanding that it would have been a sheer misery to see it go to another destination and be cut up for watch faces or something like that," he commented.
