= Cacholong =

Variety of opal

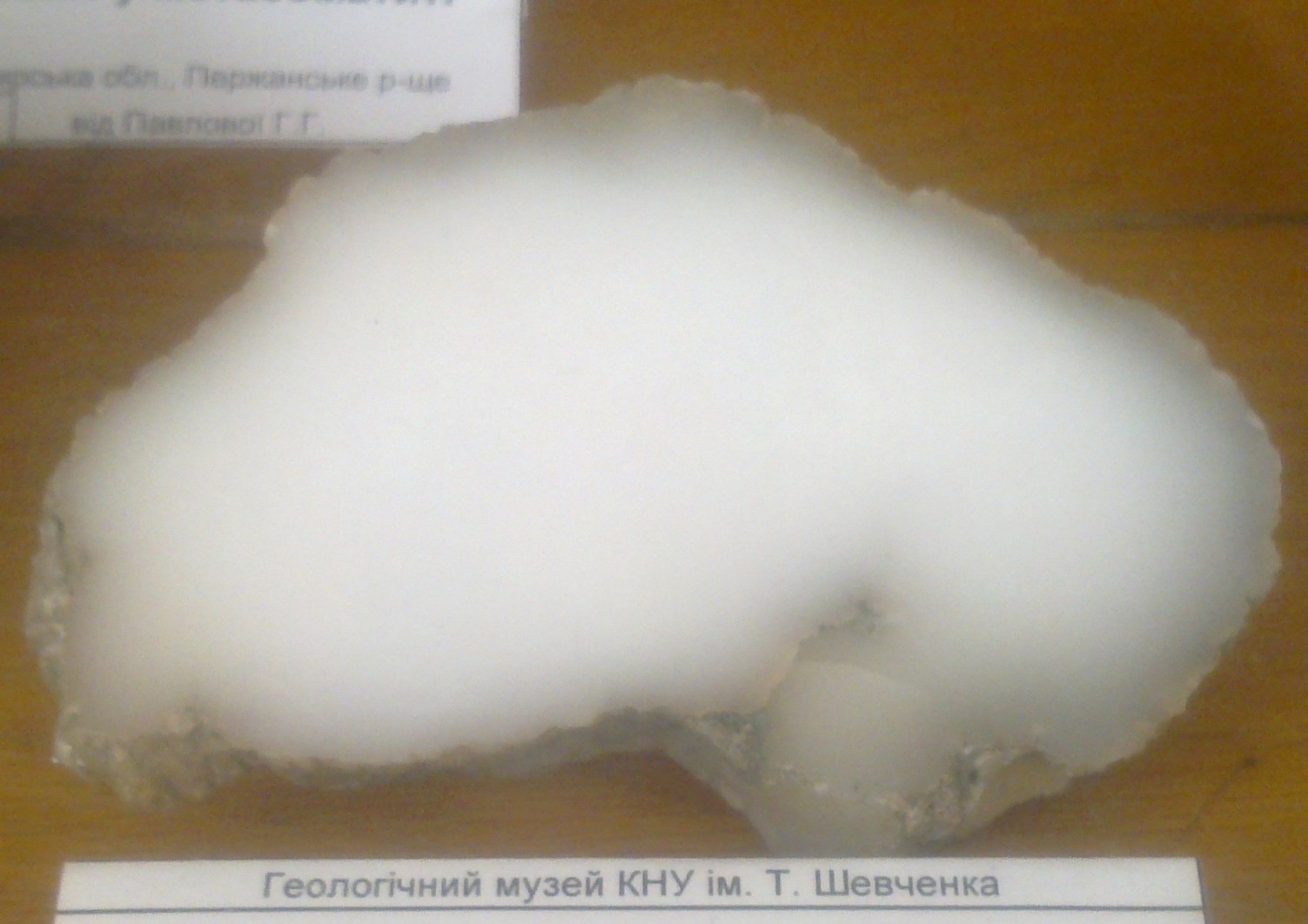
- Cacholong, in the Geological Museum of Kiev University

General
- Category: Mineraloid
- Formula: SiO_{2} · nH_{2}O
- IMA status: Variety of Opal

Identification
- Colour: Milky white, bluish white or cream

Cacholong, also known as Kalmuck agate, is a form of common opal, although it is often mistaken for agate or chalcedony, and Parker Cleaveland claimed it was a variety of chalcedony. It has a milky white colour that can also be described as bluish white or cream. With a Mohs hardness of about 6, it is used for carving, cameos, etc. The word "cacholong" has also been used as a synonym for actinolite.

Found in Austria, Czech Republic, and Uzbekistan, its name possibly comes from the Cach River in Bukhara. It is also known to occur in Iceland; in the town of Huttenberg, Austria; in Deerfield and Pittsfield, Massachusetts, U.S.; in the Faroe Islands; in Elba, Italy; and in Spain; and in Nova Scotia, Canada.

The gemstone sculpture Sultry Midday by Vasily Konovalenko, which depicted two women having tea, incorporated a cacholong teacup.
