= Hyalite =

Transparent form of opal

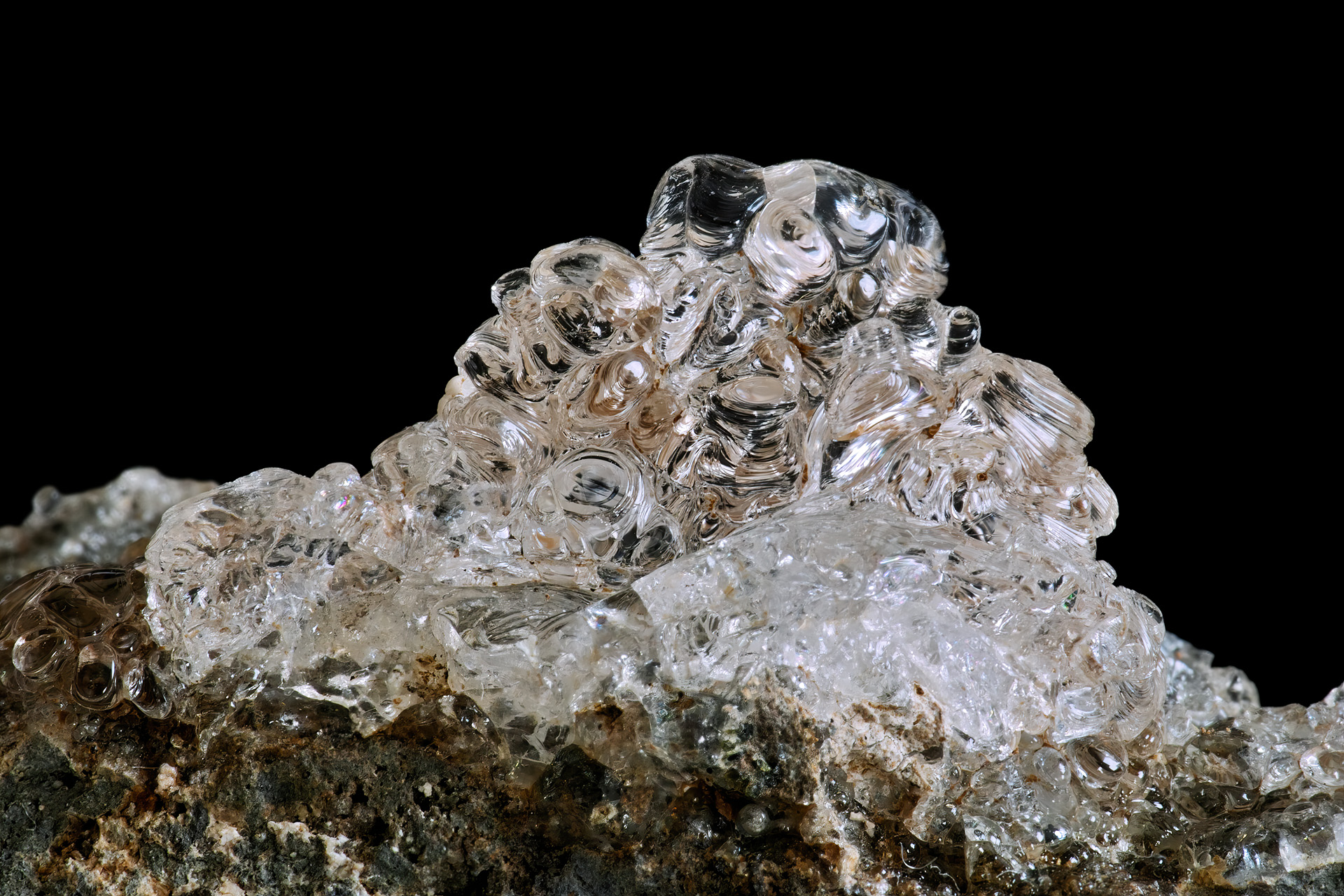
A sample of hyalite

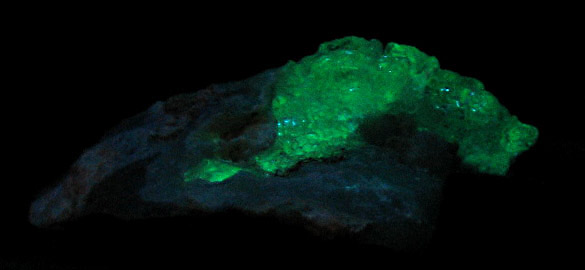
Fluorescent hyalite under an ultraviolet blacklight

Hyalite is a transparent form of opal with a glassy lustre. It may exhibit an internal play of colors if natural inclusions are present. It is also called Muller's glass, water opal, and jalite. Müller's glass is named after its discoverer, Franz-Joseph Müller von Reichenstein.

== Properties ==
Hyalite has a hardness of 5.5–6 on the Mohs scale and a specific gravity of 1.9–2.1. Lacking a plane of cleavage, it has a conchoidal fracture. The transparent or translucent mineraloid has a globular structure, a vitreous luster, and a white streak. Hyalite is an amorphous form of silica (SiO_{2}) formed as a volcanic sublimate in volcanic or pegmatic rock and is thereby considered a mineraloid. It contains 3–8% water, either as a silanol group or in molecular form.

== Uses ==
Opalescent hyalite is used in jewellery, and well-formed samples are of interest to collectors due to their unusual appearance, mode of formation and relative rarity. It is sometimes mistaken for resin opal or silica glass since they both may appear clear and globular, but it can be identified under ultraviolet light due to its bright green fluorescence.
