= Geyserite =

Form of opaline silica often found around hot springs and geysers

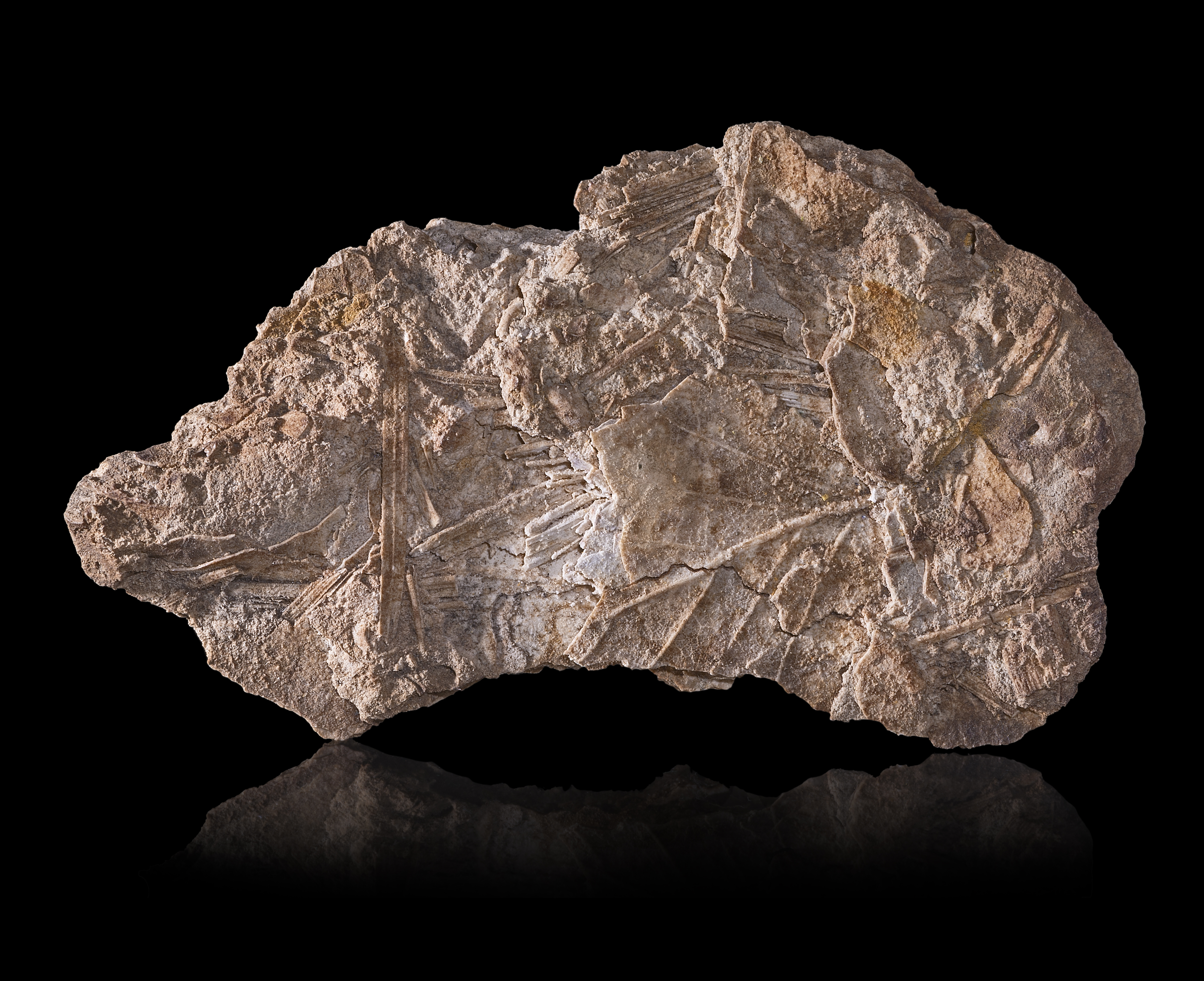
Geyserite from Iceland

Geyserite, or siliceous sinter, is a form of opaline silica that is often found as crusts or layers around hot springs and geysers. Botryoidal geyserite is known as fiorite. Geyserite is porous due to the silica enclosing many small cavities. Siliceous sinter, usually grey or light colored, should not be confused with calcareous sinter, which is made of calcium carbonate, softer, and often more colorful.

In May 2017, evidence of the earliest known life on land may have been found in 3.48-billion-year-old geyserite uncovered in the Pilbara Craton of Western Australia.

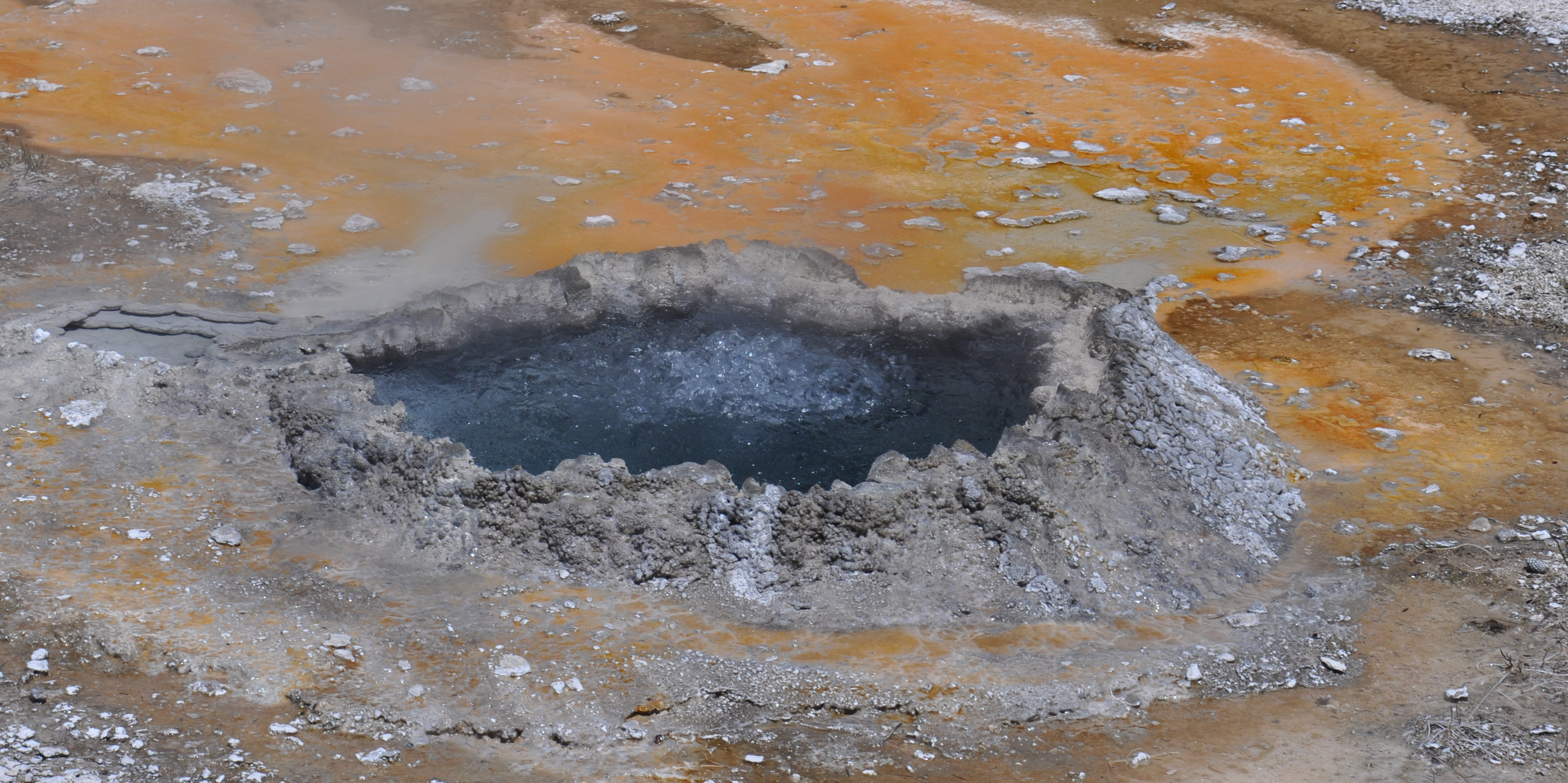
Geyserite basin at Chinese Spring, Upper Geyser Basin, Yellowstone

== See also ==
- Abiogenesis – Life arising from non-living matter
- Geothermal areas of Yellowstone – Geyser basins and other geothermal features in Yellowstone National Park
