= Rutilated quartz =

Quartz variety

Rutilated Quartz
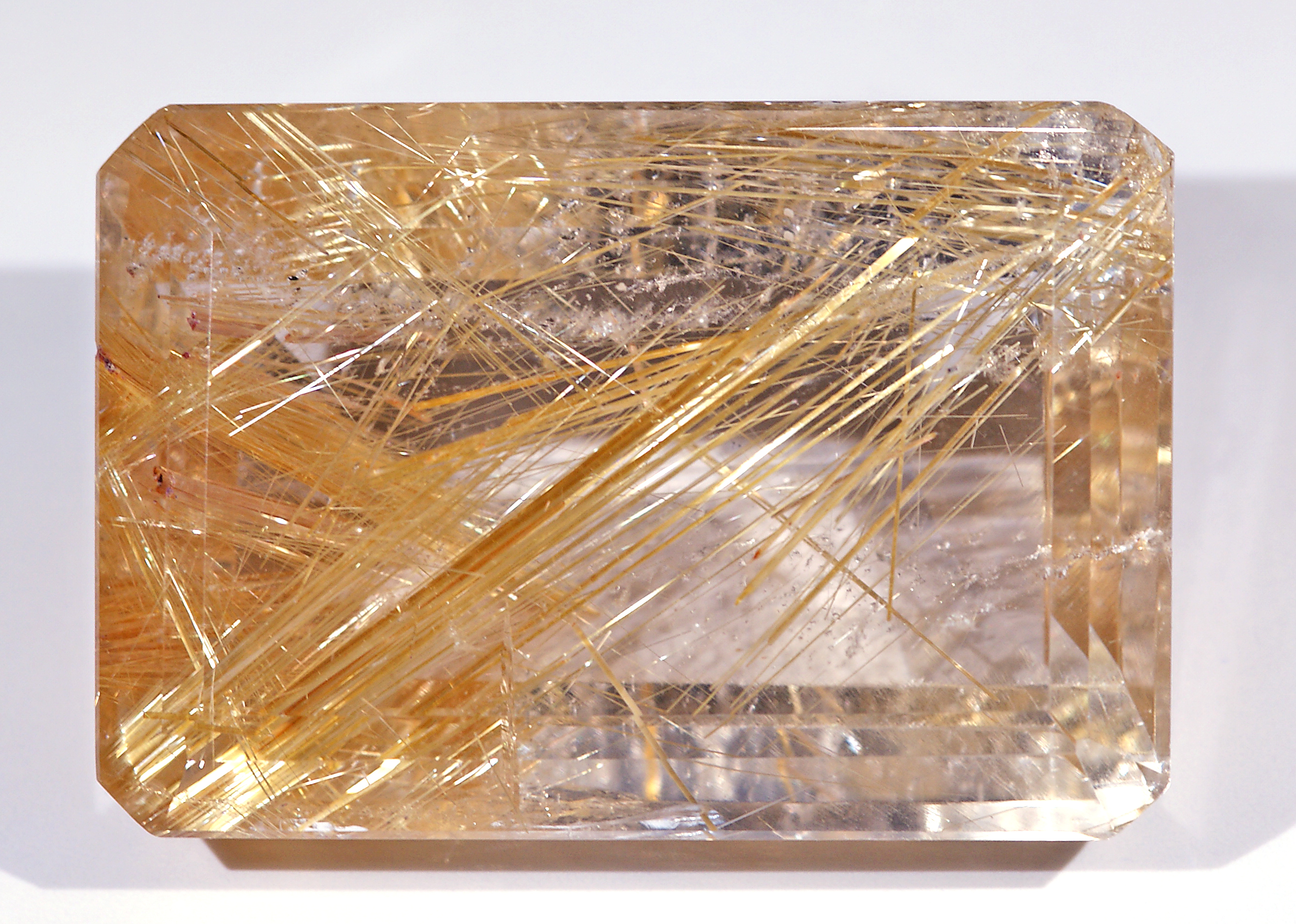
- Rutilated quartz used as a gemstone

General
- Category: Silicate minerals
- Formula: SiO_{2}

Rutilated quartz, also known as Venus' Hair Stone, is a variety of quartz which contains acicular, or needle-like inclusions of rutile. These inclusions mostly look golden, but they also can appear silver, copper red or black. Rutilated quartz is used as gemstones.

The inclusions may be distributed randomly or in bundles, which sometimes are arranged in a star-like formation, and they can be sparse or dense enough to make the quartz body nearly opaque.

While otherwise inclusions often reduce the value of a crystal, rutilated quartz is valued for the quality of these inclusions.

== See also ==
- Phantom quartz
