= Opal =

Hydrated amorphous form of silica

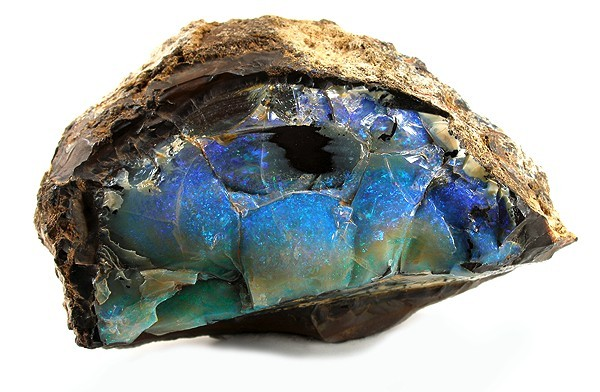
- A rich seam of iridescent opal encased in matrix

General
- Category: Mineraloid
- Formula: Hydrated silica. SiO_{2}·nH_{2}O
- IMA symbol: Opl
- Crystal system: Amorphous

Identification
- Color: Colorless, white, yellow, red, orange, green, brown, black, blue, pink
- Crystal habit: Irregular veins, in masses, in nodules
- Cleavage: None
- Fracture: Conchoidal to uneven
- Mohs scale hardness: 5.5–6
- Luster: Subvitreous to waxy
- Streak: White
- Diaphaneity: opaque, translucent, transparent
- Specific gravity: 2.15+0.08 −0.90
- Density: 2.09 g/cm^{3}
- Polish luster: Vitreous to resinous
- Optical properties: Single refractive, often anomalous double refractive due to strain
- Refractive index: 1.450+0.020 −0.080; Mexican opal may read as low as 1.37, but typically reads 1.42–1.43
- Birefringence: none
- Pleochroism: None
- Ultraviolet fluorescence: black or white body color: inert to white to moderate light blue, green, or yellow in long and short wave, may also phosphoresce, common opal: inert to strong green or yellowish green in long and short wave, may phosphoresce; fire opal: inert to moderate greenish brown in long and short wave, may phosphoresce
- Absorption spectra: green stones: 660 nm, 470 nm cutoff
- Diagnostic features: darkening upon heating
- Solubility: hot salt water, bases, methanol, humic acid, hydrofluoric acid

Opal is a hydrated amorphous form of silica (SiO_{2}·nH_{2}O); its water content may range from 3% to 21% by mass, but is usually between 6% and 10%. Due to the amorphous (chemical) physical structure, it is classified as a mineraloid, unlike crystalline forms of silica, which are considered minerals. It is deposited at a relatively low temperature and may occur in the fissures of almost any kind of rock, being most commonly found with limonite, sandstone, rhyolite, marl, and basalt.

The name opal is believed to be derived from the Sanskrit word upala (उपल), which means 'jewel', and later the Greek derivative opállios (ὀπάλλιος).

There are two broad classes of opal: precious and common. Precious opal displays play-of-color (iridescence); common opal does not. Play-of-color is defined as "a pseudo chromatic optical effect resulting in flashes of colored light from certain minerals, as they are turned in white light". The internal structure of precious opal causes it to diffract light, resulting in play-of-color. Depending on the conditions in which it formed, opal may be transparent, translucent, or opaque, and the background color may be white, black, or nearly any color of the visual spectrum. Black opal is considered the rarest, while white, gray, and green opals are the most common.

== Precious opal ==
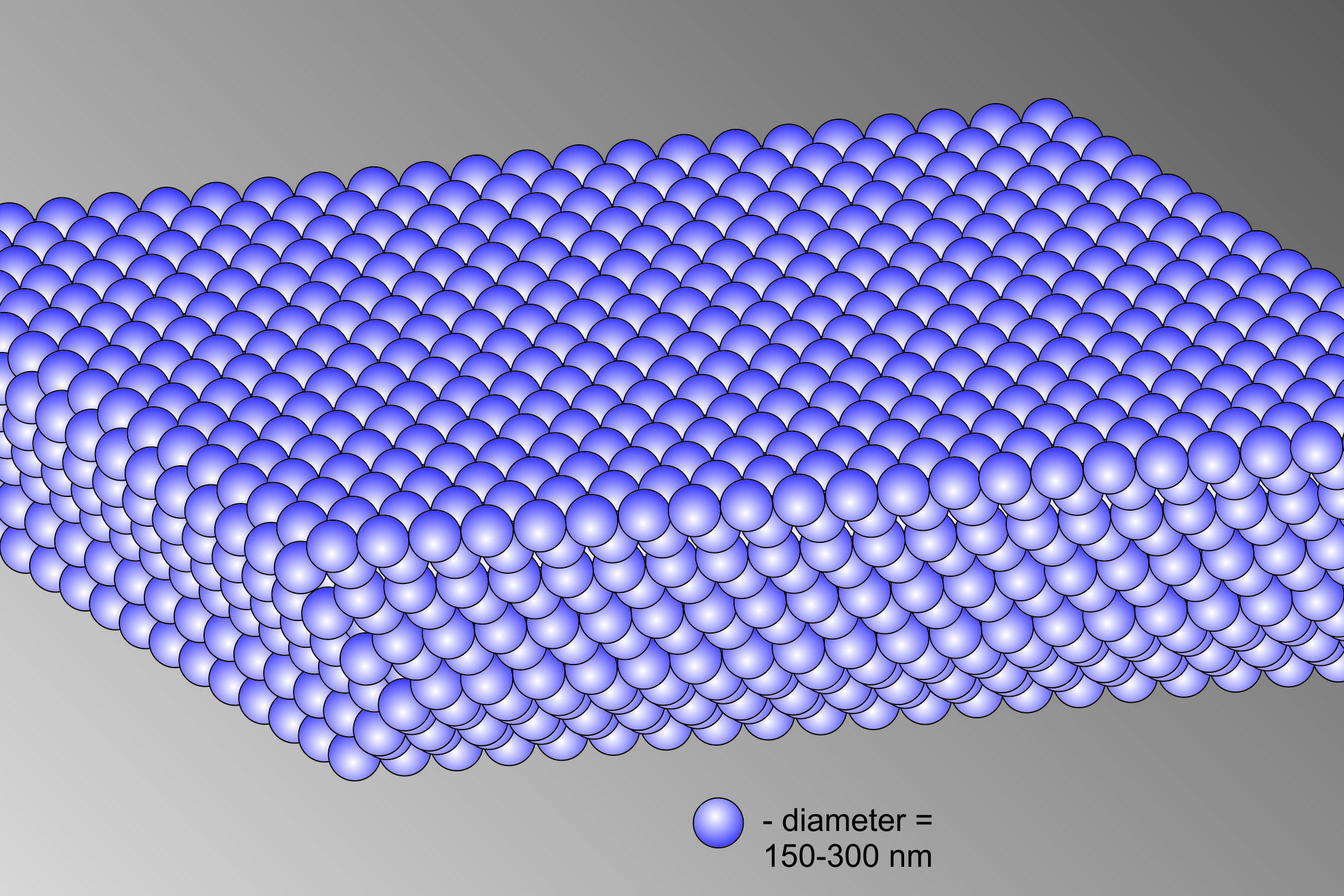
Precious opal consists of a regular arrangement of silica nanospheres in closely packed planes (idealized diagram).

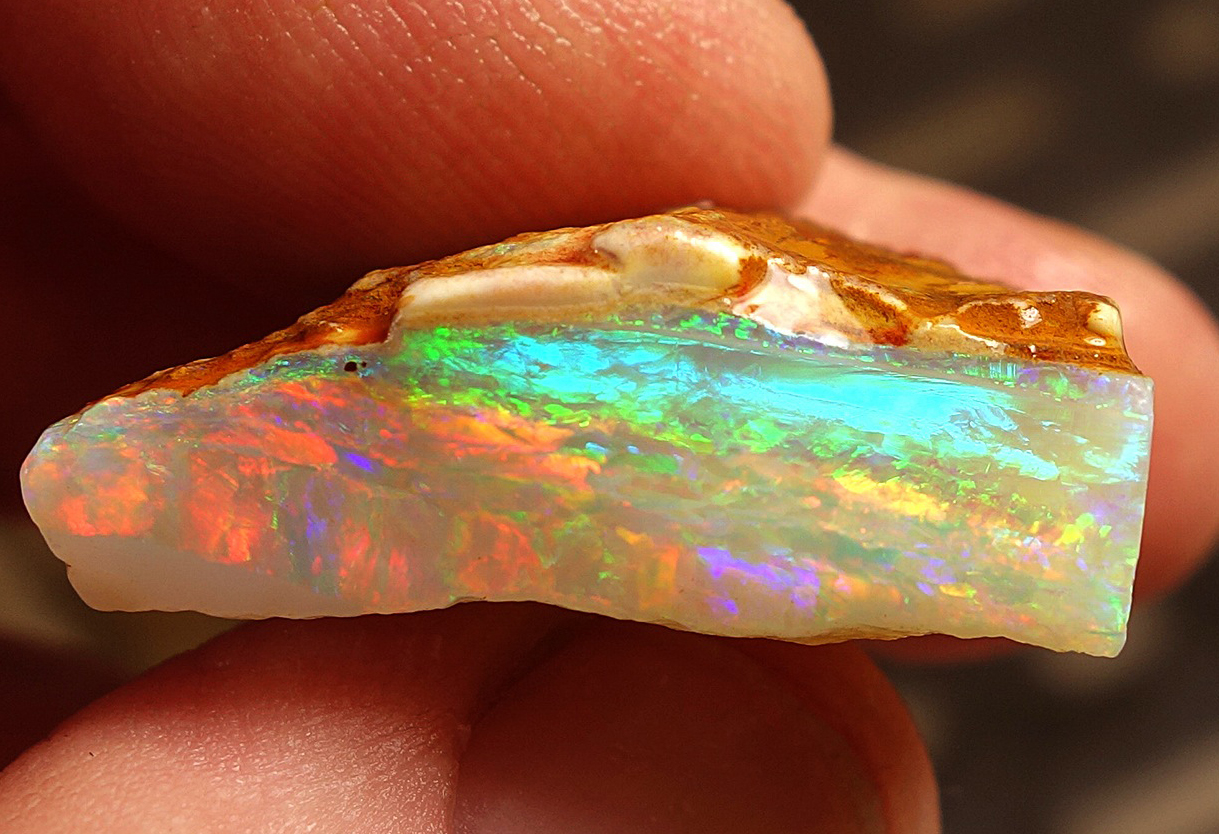
This precious rough opal from Coober Pedy, South Australia, displays nearly every color of the visible spectrum.

Precious opal shows a variable interplay of internal colors, and though it is a mineraloid, it has an internal structure. At microscopic scales, precious opal is composed of silica spheres some 150–300 nm (5.9×10^{−6}–1.18×10^{−5} in) in diameter in a hexagonal or cubic close-packed lattice. It was shown by J. V. Sanders in the mid-1960s that these ordered silica spheres produce the internal colors by causing the interference and diffraction of light passing through the microstructure of the opal. The regularity of the sizes and the packing of these spheres is a prime determinant of the quality of precious opal. Where the distance between the regularly packed planes of spheres is around half the wavelength of a component of visible light, the light of that wavelength may be subject to diffraction from the grating created by the stacked planes. The colors that are observed are determined by the spacing between the planes and the orientation of planes with respect to the incident light. The process can be described by Bragg's law of diffraction.

Visible light cannot pass through large thicknesses of the opal. This is the basis of the optical band gap in a photonic crystal. In addition, microfractures may be filled with secondary silica and form thin lamellae inside the opal during its formation. The term opalescence is commonly used to describe this unique and beautiful phenomenon, which in gemology is termed play of color. In gemology, opalescence is applied to the hazy-milky-turbid sheen of common or potch opal which does not show a play of color. Opalescence is a form of adularescence.

For use in jewellery, most opal is cut and polished to form a cabochon, a convex shape that maximises the viewing angles through which an opal's play of colour can be observed. "Natural" opal refers to polished stones consisting wholly of precious opal. Opals too thin to produce a "natural" opal may be combined with other materials to form "composite" gems. An opal doublet consists of a relatively thin layer of precious opal, backed by a layer of dark-colored material, most commonly ironstone, dark or black common opal (potch), onyx, or obsidian. The darker backing emphasizes the play of color and results in a more attractive display than a lighter potch. An opal triplet is similar to a doublet but has a third layer, a domed cap of clear quartz or plastic on the top. The cap takes a high polish and acts as a protective layer for the opal. The top layer also acts as a magnifier, to emphasize the play of color of the opal beneath, which is often an inferior specimen or an extremely thin section of precious opal. Triplet opals tend to have a more artificial appearance and are not classed as precious gemstones, but rather "composite" gemstones. Jewelry applications of precious opal can be somewhat limited by opal's sensitivity to heat due primarily to its relatively high water content and predisposition to scratching. Combined with modern techniques of polishing, a doublet opal can produce a similar effect to Natural black or boulder opal at a fraction of the price. Doublet opal also has the added benefit of having genuine opal as the top visible and touchable layer, unlike triplet opals.

== Common opal ==
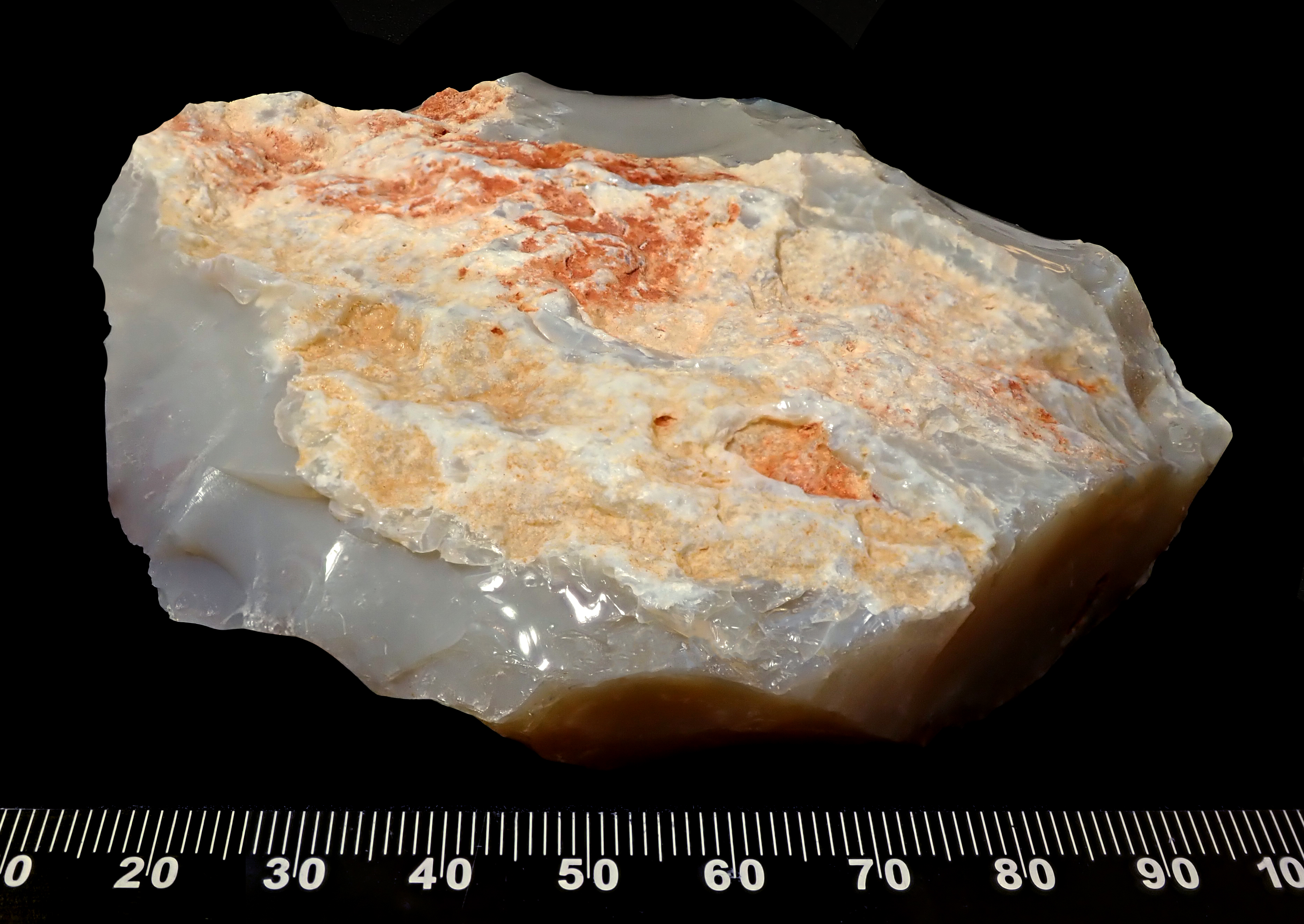
Common rough opal

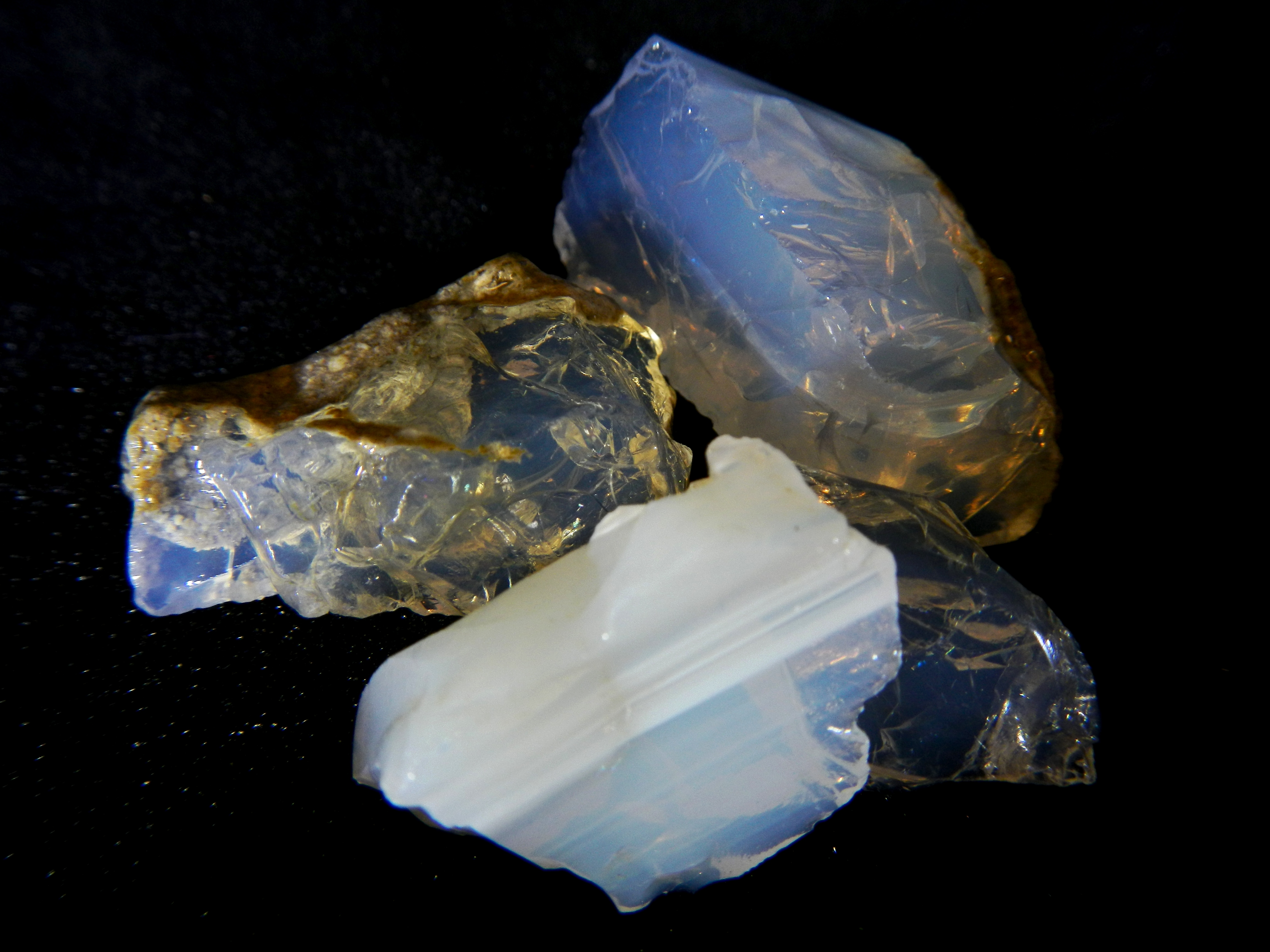
White and blue opal from Slovakia

Besides the gemstone varieties that show a play of color, the other kinds of common opal include the milk opal, milky bluish to greenish (which can sometimes be of gemstone quality); resin opal, which is honey-yellow with a resinous luster; wood opal, which is caused by the replacement of the organic material in wood with opal; menilite, which is brown or grey; hyalite, a colorless glass-clear opal sometimes called Muller's glass; geyserite, also called siliceous sinter, deposited around hot springs or geysers; and diatomaceous earth, the accumulations of diatom shells or tests. Common opal often displays a hazy-milky-turbid sheen from within the stone. In gemology, this optical effect is strictly defined as opalescence which is a form of adularescence.

== Varieties of common opal ==
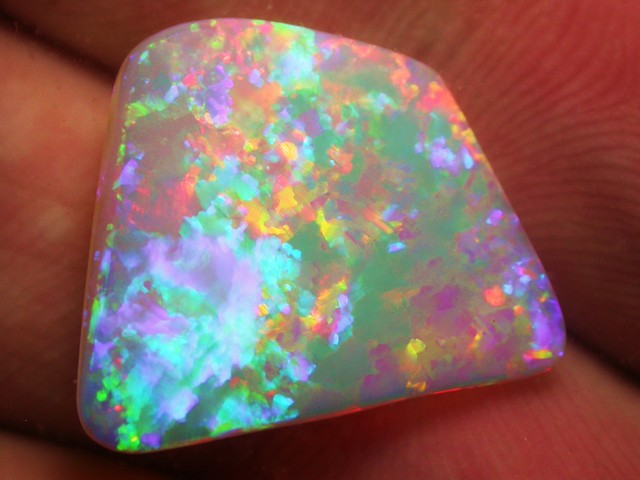
Brazilian precious opal with patches of brilliant color throughout. The brightness of the fire in opal ranges on a scale of 1 to 5 (with 5 being the brightest).

"Girasol opal" is a term sometimes mistakenly and improperly used to refer to fire opals, as well as a type of transparent to semitransparent type milky quartz from Madagascar which displays an asterism, or star effect, when cut properly. However, the true girasol opal is a type of hyalite opal that exhibits a bluish glow or sheen that follows the light source around. It is not a play of color as seen in precious opal, but rather an effect from microscopic inclusions. It is also sometimes referred to as water opal, too, when it is from Mexico. The two most notable locations of this type of opal are Oregon and Mexico.

A Peruvian opal (also called blue opal) is a semi-opaque to opaque blue-green stone found in Peru, which is often cut to include the matrix in the more opaque stones. It does not display a play of color. Blue opal also comes from Oregon and Idaho in the Owyhee region, as well as from Nevada around the Virgin Valley.

Opal is also formed by diatoms. Diatoms are a form of algae that, when they die, often form layers at the bottoms of lakes, bays, or oceans. Their cell walls are made up of hydrated silicon dioxide which gives them structural coloration and therefore the appearance of tiny opals when viewed under a microscope. These cell walls or "tests" form the "grains" for the diatomaceous earth. This sedimentary rock is white, opaque, and chalky in texture. Diatomite has multiple industrial uses such as filtering or adsorbing since it has a fine particle size and very porous nature, and gardening to increase water absorption.

== History ==
Opal was rare and very valuable in antiquity. In Europe, it was a gem prized by royalty. Until the opening of vast deposits in Australia in the 19th century the only known source was Červenica beyond the Roman frontier in Slovakia. Opal is the national gemstone of Australia.

== Sources ==
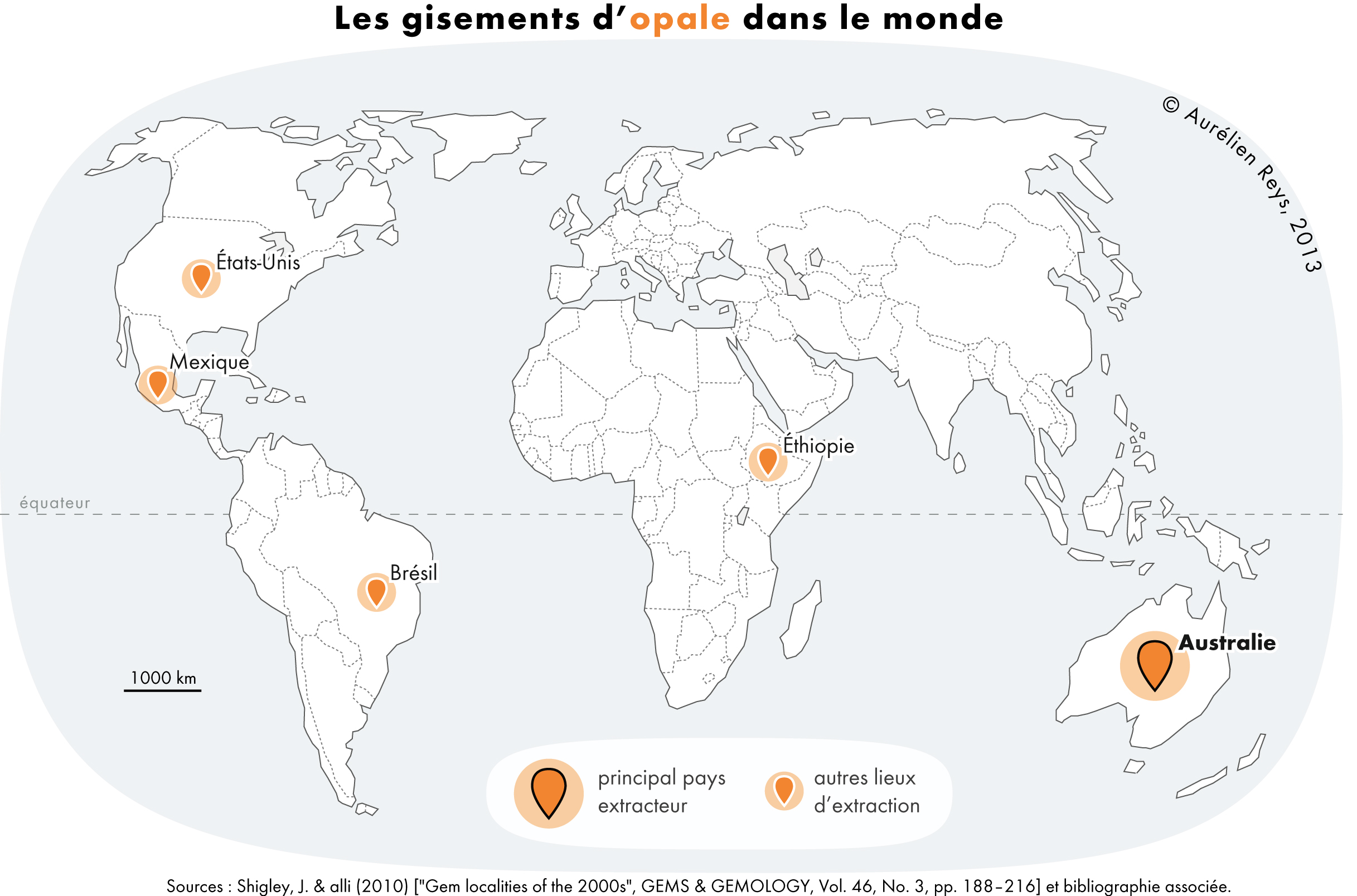
Main opal producing countries

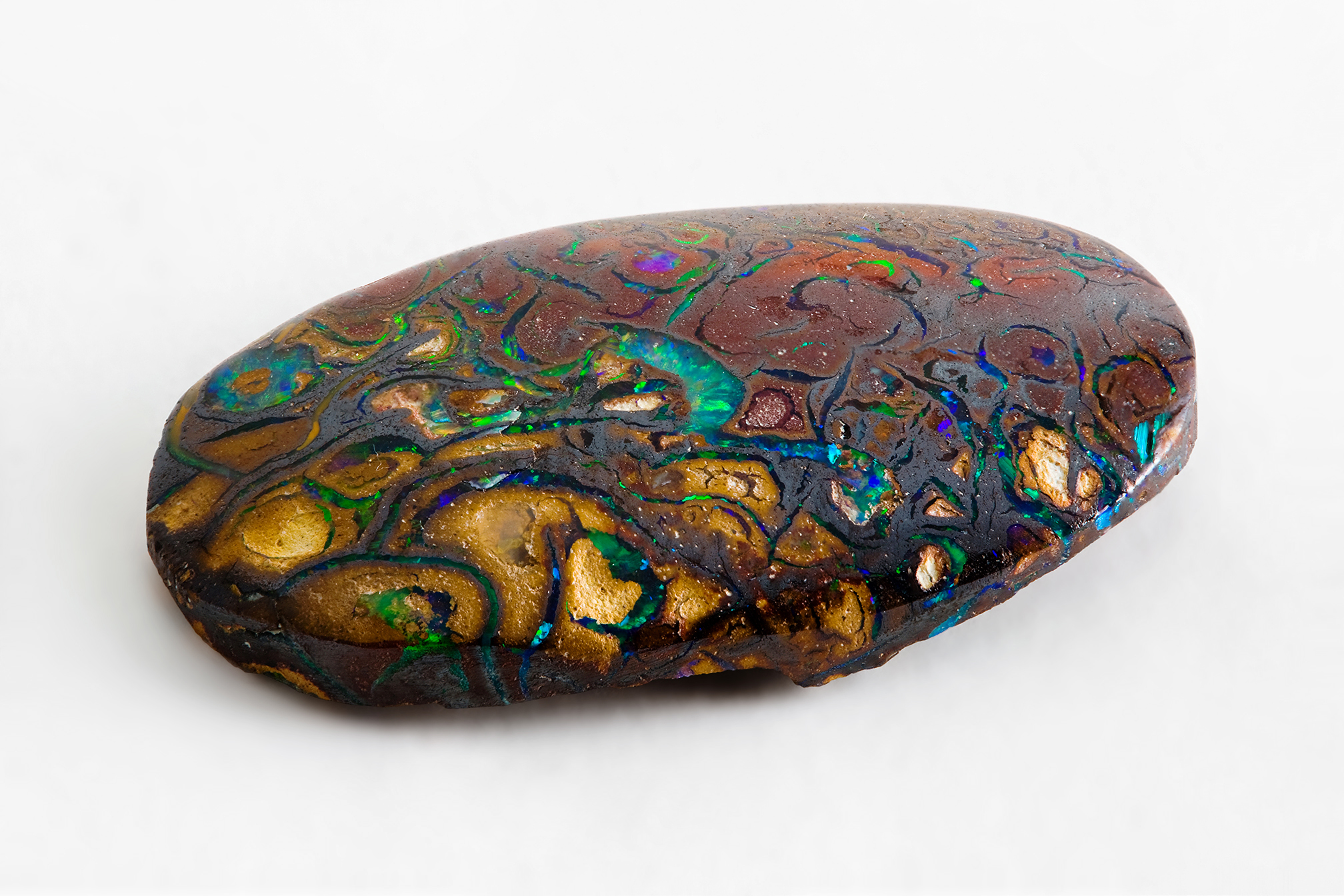
Polished opal from Yowah (Yowah Nut), Queensland

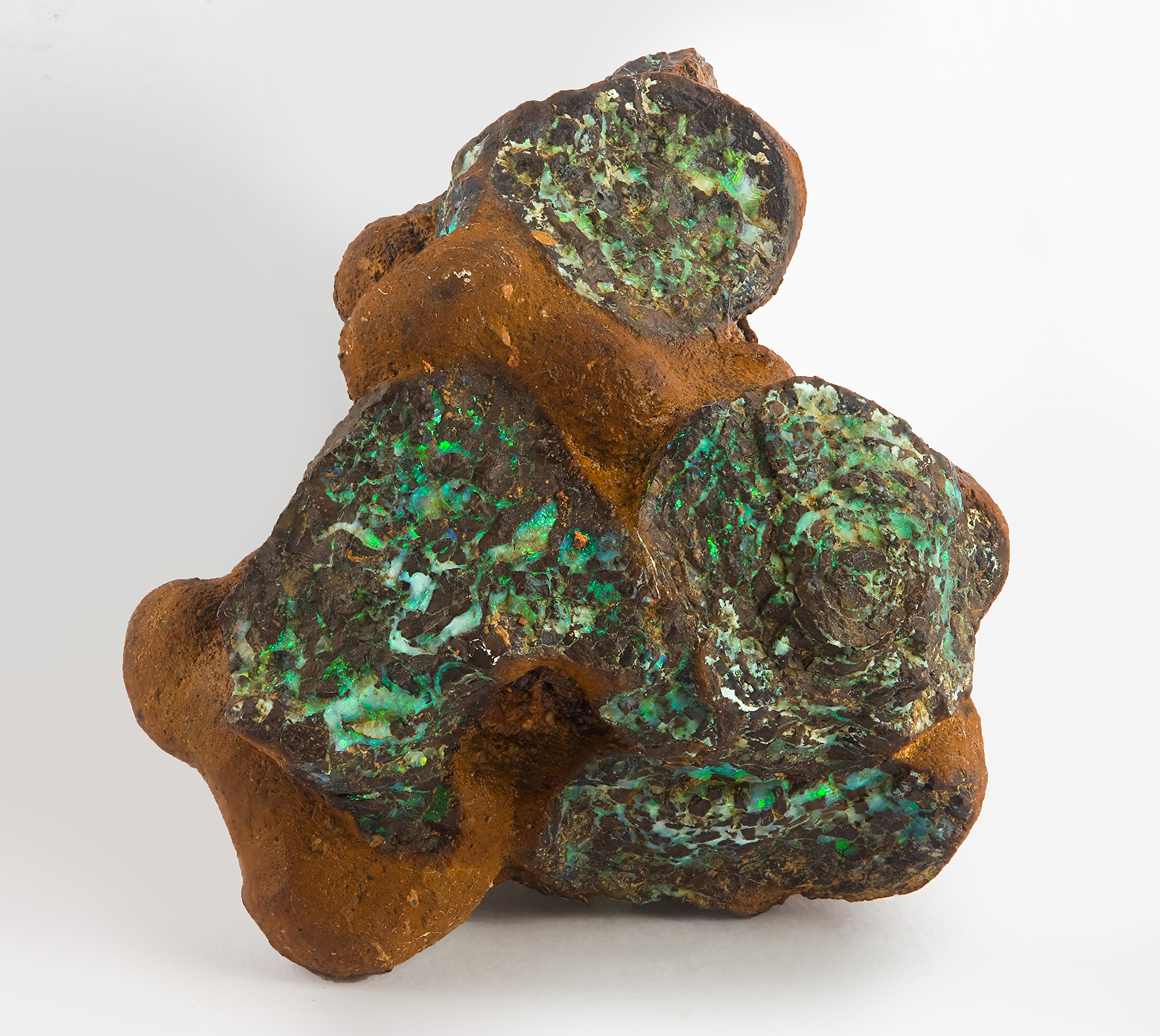
Boulder opal, Carisbrooke Station near Winton, Queensland

The primary sources of opal are Australia and Ethiopia, but because of inconsistent and widely varying accountings of their respective levels of extraction, it is difficult to accurately state what proportion of the global supply of opal comes from either country. Australian opal has been cited as accounting for 95–97% of the world's supply of precious opal, with the state of South Australia accounting for 80% of the world's supply. In 2012, Ethiopian opal production was estimated to be 14,000 kg (31,000 lb) by the United States Geological Survey. USGS data from the same period (2012), reveals Australian opal production to be $41 million. Because of the units of measurement, it is not possible to directly compare Australian and Ethiopian opal production, but these data and others suggest that the traditional percentages given for Australian opal production may be overstated. Yet, the validity of data in the USGS report appears to conflict with that of Laurs et al. and Mesfin, who estimated the 2012 Ethiopian opal output (from Wegeltena) to be only 750 kg (1,650 lb).

=== Australia ===
The town of Coober Pedy in South Australia is a major source of opal. The world's largest and most valuable gem opal "Olympic Australis" was found in August 1956 at the "Eight Mile" opal field in Coober Pedy. It weighs 17,000 carats (3.4 kg; 7.5 lb) and is 270mm long, with a height of 120mm and a width of 110mm.

The Mintabie Opal Field in South Australia located about 250 km (160 mi) northwest of Coober Pedy has also produced large quantities of crystal opal and the rarer black opal. Over the years, it has been sold overseas incorrectly as Coober Pedy opal. The black opal is said to be some of the best examples found in Australia.

Andamooka in South Australia is also a major producer of matrix opal, crystal opal, and black opal. Another Australian town, Lightning Ridge in New South Wales, is the main source of black opal, opal containing a predominantly dark background (dark gray to blue-black displaying the play of color), collected from the Griman Creek Formation. Boulder opal consists of concretions and fracture fillings in a dark siliceous ironstone matrix. It is found sporadically in western Queensland, from Kynuna in the north, to Yowah and Koroit in the south. Its largest quantities are found around Jundah and Quilpie in South West Queensland. Australia also has opalized fossil remains, including dinosaur bones in New South Wales and South Australia, and marine creatures in South Australia.

=== Ethiopia ===
Opal from Ethiopia

The first published report of gem opal from Ethiopia appeared in 1994, with the discovery of precious opal in the Menz Gishe District, North Shewa Province. The opal, found mostly in the form of nodules, was of volcanic origin and was found predominantly within weathered layers of rhyolite. This Shewa Province opal was mostly dark brown in color and had a tendency to crack. These qualities made it unpopular in the gem trade. In 2008, a new opal deposit was found approximately 180 km north of Shewa Province, near the town of Wegeltena, in Ethiopia's Wollo Province. The Wollo Province opal was different from the previous Ethiopian opal finds in that it more closely resembled the sedimentary opals of Australia and Brazil, with a light background and often vivid play-of-color. Wollo Province opal, more commonly referred to as "Welo" or "Wello" opal, has become the dominant Ethiopian opal in the gem trade.

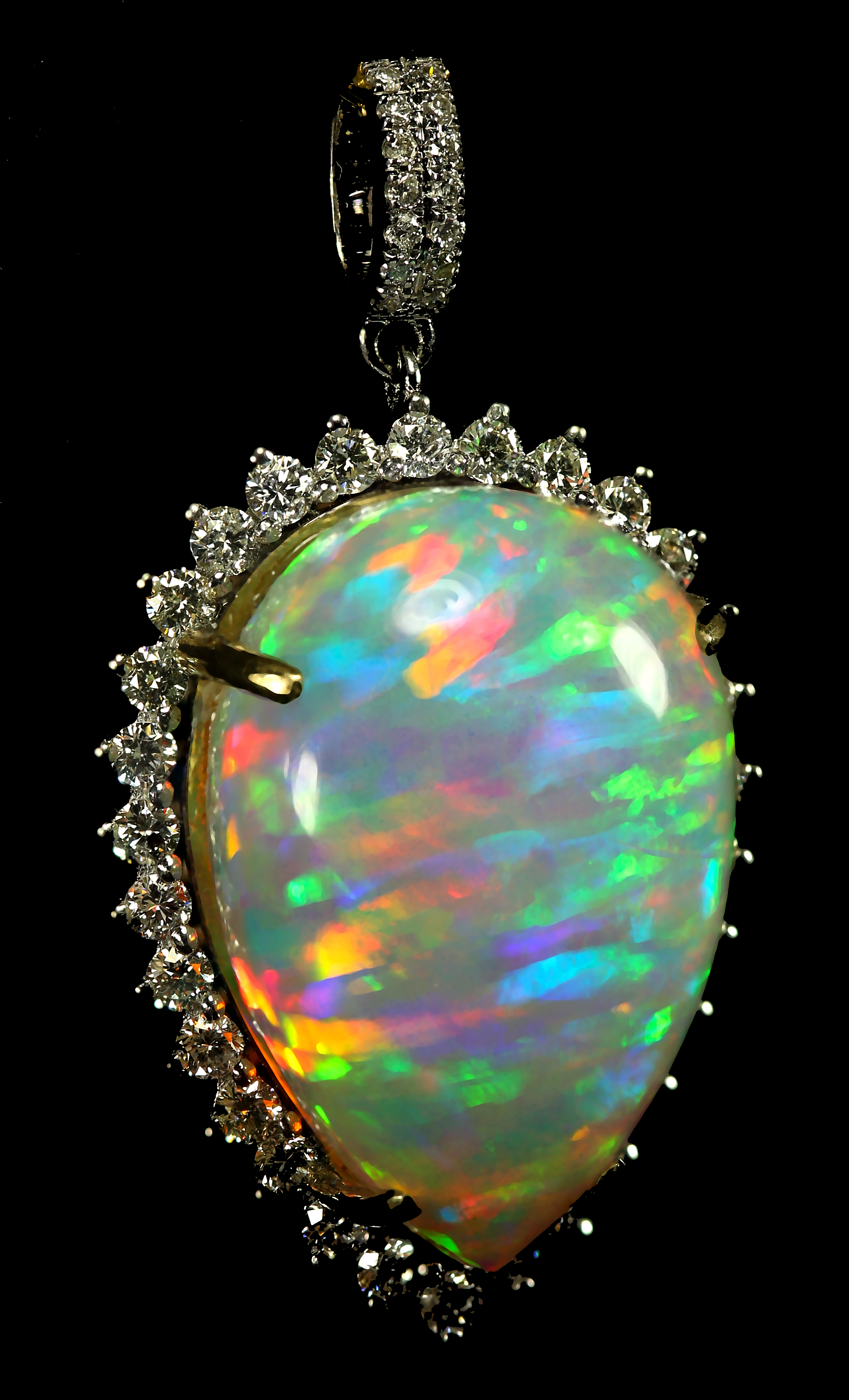
Gem grade Ethiopian Welo precious opal pendant

=== Virgin Valley, Nevada ===
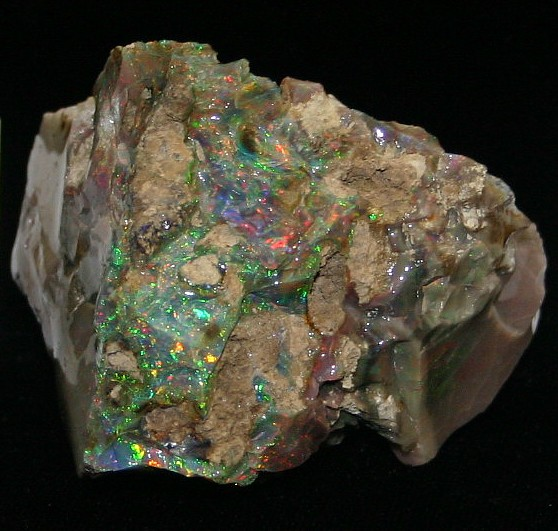
Multicolored rough opal specimen from Virgin Valley, Nevada, US

The Virgin Valley opal fields of Humboldt County in northern Nevada produce a wide variety of precious black, crystal, white, fire, and lemon opal. The black fire opal is the official gemstone of Nevada. Most of the precious opal is partial wood replacement. The precious opal is hosted and found in situ within a subsurface horizon or zone of bentonite, which is considered a "lode" deposit. Opals which have weathered out of the in situ deposits are alluvial and considered placer deposits. Miocene-age opalised teeth, bones, fish, and a snake head have been found. Some of the opal has high water content and may desiccate and crack when dried. The largest producing mines of Virgin Valley have been the famous Rainbow Ridge, Royal Peacock, Bonanza, Opal Queen, and WRT Stonetree/Black Beauty mines. The largest unpolished black opal in the Smithsonian Institution, known as the "Roebling opal", came out of the tunneled portion of the Rainbow Ridge Mine in 1917, and weighs 2,585 carats (517.0 g; 18.24 oz). The largest polished black opal in the Smithsonian Institution comes from the Royal Peacock opal mine in the Virgin Valley, weighing 160 carats (32 g; 1.1 oz), known as the "Black Peacock".

=== Mexico ===
Fire opal is a transparent to translucent opal with warm body colors of yellow to orange to red. Although fire opals don't usually show any play of color, they occasionally exhibit bright green flashes. The most famous source of fire opals is the state of Querétaro in Mexico; these opals are commonly called Mexican fire opals. Fire opals that do not show a play of color are sometimes referred to as jelly opals. Mexican opals are sometimes cut in their rhyolitic host material if it is hard enough to allow cutting and polishing. This type of Mexican opal is referred to as a Cantera opal. Another type of opal from Mexico, referred to as Mexican water opal, is a colorless opal that exhibits either a bluish or golden internal sheen.

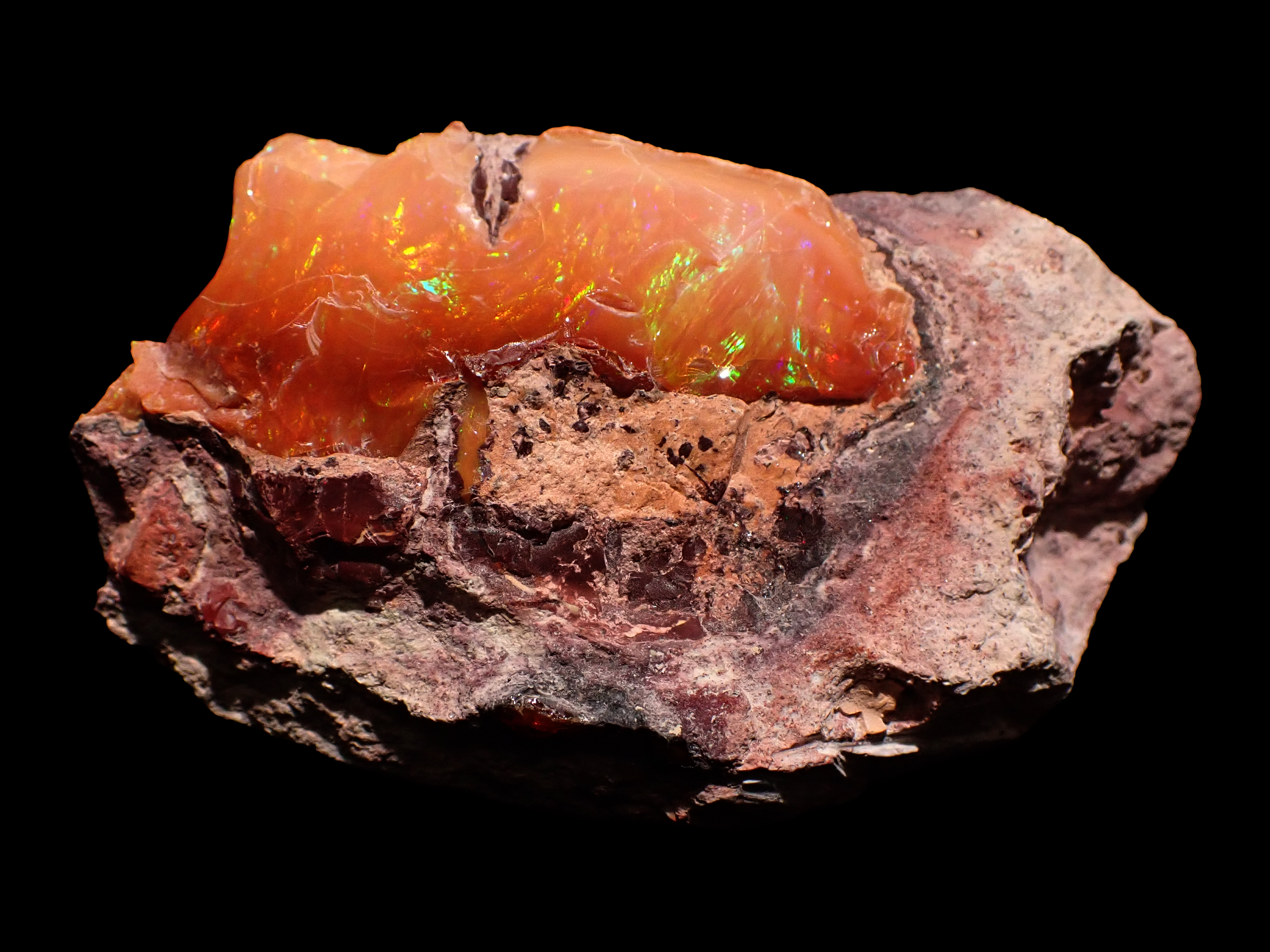
Precious Mexican Fire Opal has bright green and yellow patches (play of color) with an orange-red background typical of Fire Opal.

Opal occurs in significant quantity and variety in central Mexico, where mining and production first originated in the state of Querétaro. In this region the opal deposits are located mainly in the mountain ranges of three municipalities: Colón, Tequisquiapan, and Ezequiel Montes. During the 1960s through to the mid-1970s, the Querétaro mines were heavily mined. Today's opal miners report that it was much easier to find quality opals with a lot of fire and play of color back then, whereas today the gem-quality opals are very hard to come by and command hundreds of US dollars or more. The orange-red background color is characteristic of all "fire opals," including "Mexican fire opal".

The oldest mine in Querétaro is Santa Maria del Iris. This mine was opened around 1870 and has been reopened at least 28 times since. At the moment there are about 100 mines in the regions around Querétaro, but most of them are now closed. The best quality of opals came from the mine Santa Maria del Iris, followed by La Hacienda la Esperanza, Fuentezuelas, La Carbonera, and La Trinidad. Important deposits in the state of Jalisco were not discovered until the late 1950s.

In 1957, Alfonso Ramirez (of Querétaro) accidentally discovered the first opal mine in Jalisco: La Unica, located on the outer area of the volcano of Tequila, near the Huitzicilapan farm in Magdalena. By 1960 there were around 500 known opal mines in this region alone. Other regions of the country that also produce opals (of lesser quality) are Guerrero, which produces an opaque opal similar to the opals from Australia (some of these opals are carefully treated with heat to improve their colors so high-quality opals from this area may be suspect). There are also some small opal mines in Morelos, Durango, Chihuahua, Baja California, Guanajuato, Puebla, Michoacán, and Estado de México.

=== Other locations ===
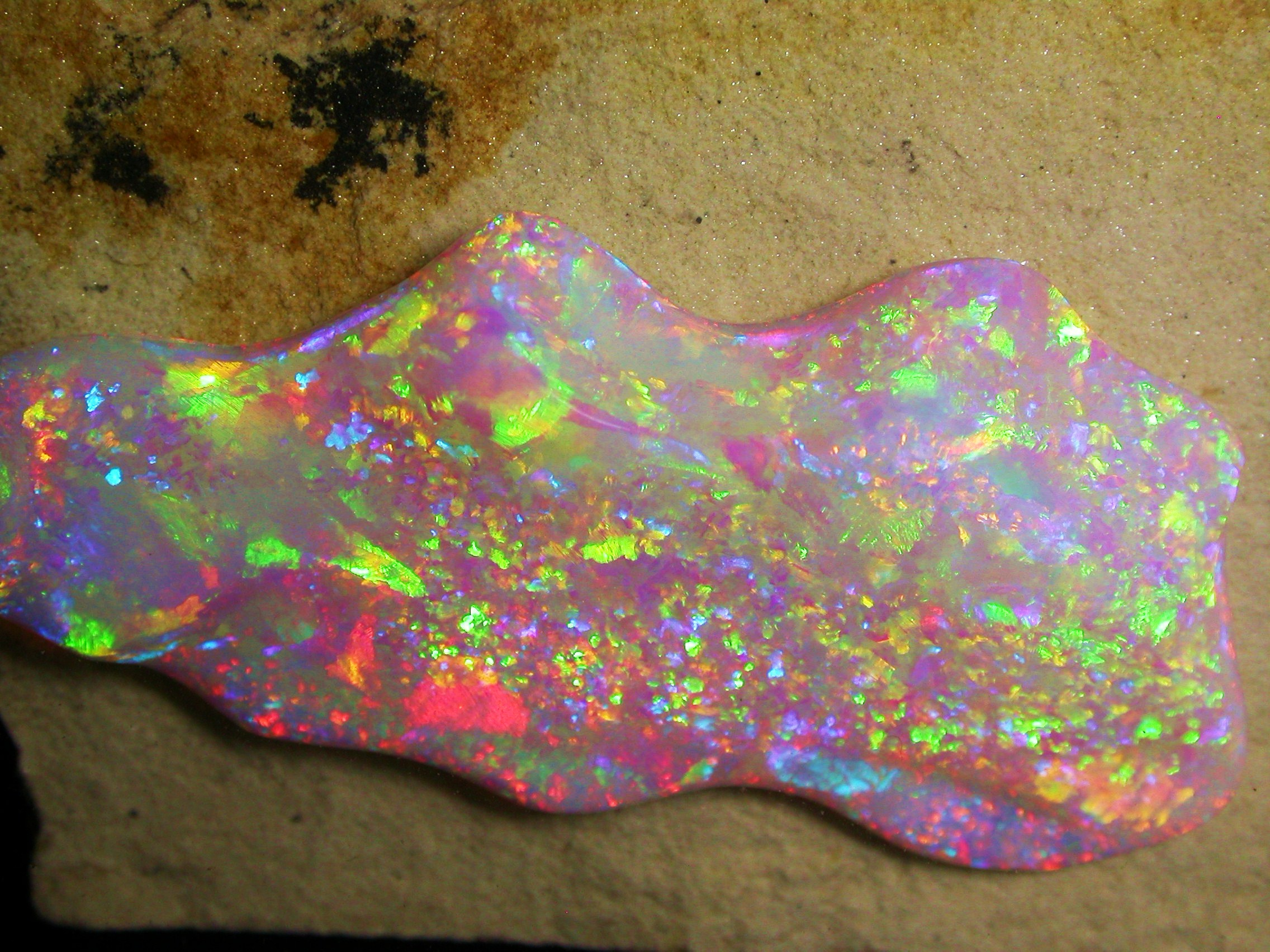
Brazilian opal

Another source of white base opal or creamy opal in the United States is Spencer, Idaho. A high percentage of the opal found there occurs in thin layers.

Other significant deposits of precious opal around the world can be found in the Czech Republic, Canada, Slovakia, Hungary, Turkey, Indonesia, Brazil (in Pedro II, Piauí), Honduras (more precisely in Erandique), Guatemala, and Nicaragua.

In late 2008, NASA announced the discovery of opal deposits on Mars.

== Fossil opal ==
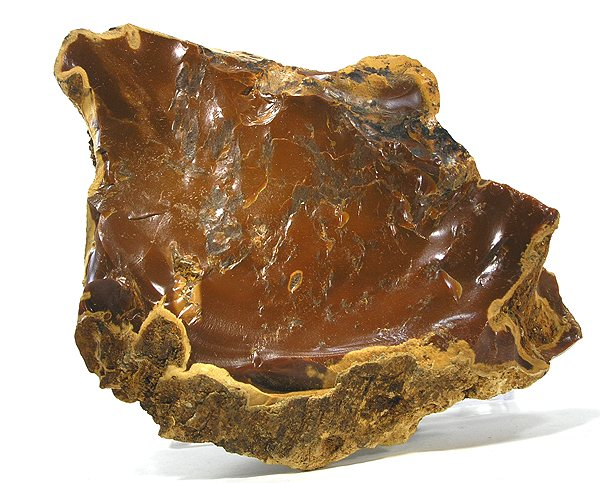
Wood opal

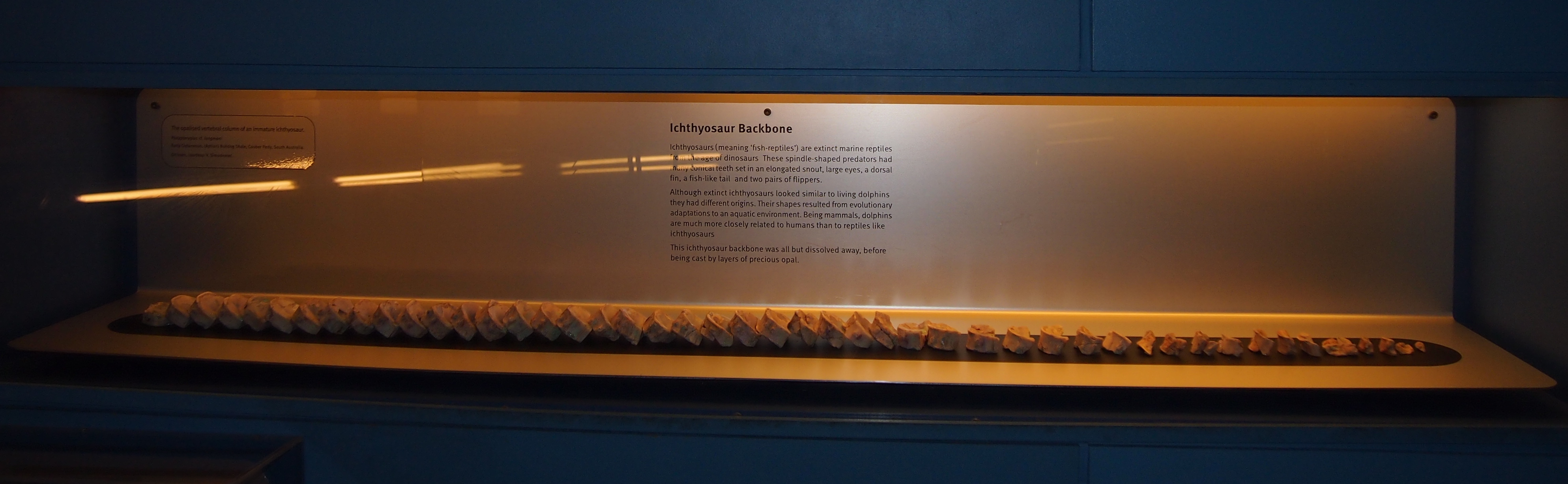
Precious opal replacing ichthyosaur backbone, as a display specimen in South Australian Museum

Wood opal, also known as xylopal, is a form of opal, as well as a type of petrified wood which has developed an opalescent sheen or, more rarely, where the wood has been completely replaced by opal. Other names for this opalized sheen-like wood are opalized wood and opalized petrified wood. It is often used as a gemstone.

== Synthetic opal ==
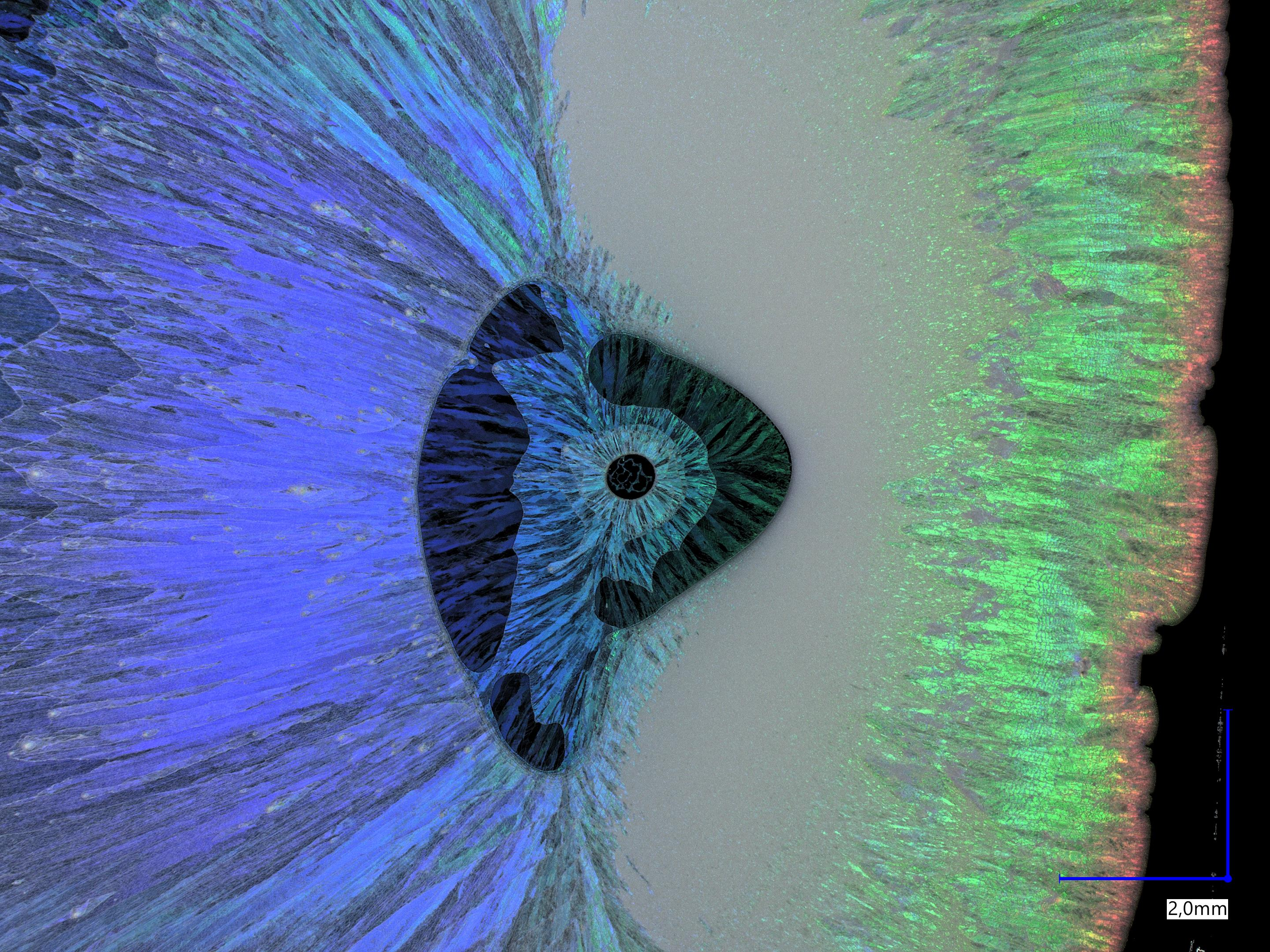
Artificial opal (made by drying a monodisperse sub-micrometer polystyrene sphere sol) viewed by darkfield optical microscopy

Opals of all varieties have been synthesized experimentally and commercially. The discovery of the ordered sphere structure of precious opal led to its synthesis by Pierre Gilson in 1974. The resulting material is distinguishable from natural opal by its regularity; under magnification, the patches of color are seen to be arranged in a "lizard skin" or "chicken wire" pattern. Furthermore, synthetic opals do not fluoresce under ultraviolet light. Synthetics are also generally lower in density and are often highly porous.

Opals which have been created in a laboratory are often termed "lab-created opals", which, while classifiable as man-made and synthetic, are very different from their resin-based counterparts which are also considered man-made and synthetic. The term "synthetic" implies that a stone has been created to be chemically and structurally indistinguishable from a genuine one, and genuine opal contains no resins or polymers. The finest modern lab-created opals do not exhibit the lizard skin or columnar patterning of earlier lab-created varieties, and their patterns are non-directional. They can still be distinguished from genuine opals, however, by their lack of inclusions and the absence of any surrounding non-opal matrix. While many genuine opals are cut and polished without a matrix, the presence of irregularities in their play-of-color continues to mark them as distinct from even the best lab-created synthetics.

Other research in macroporous structures have yielded highly ordered materials that have similar optical properties to opals and have been used in cosmetics. Synthetic opals are also deeply investigated in photonics for sensing and light management purposes.

== Local atomic structure ==
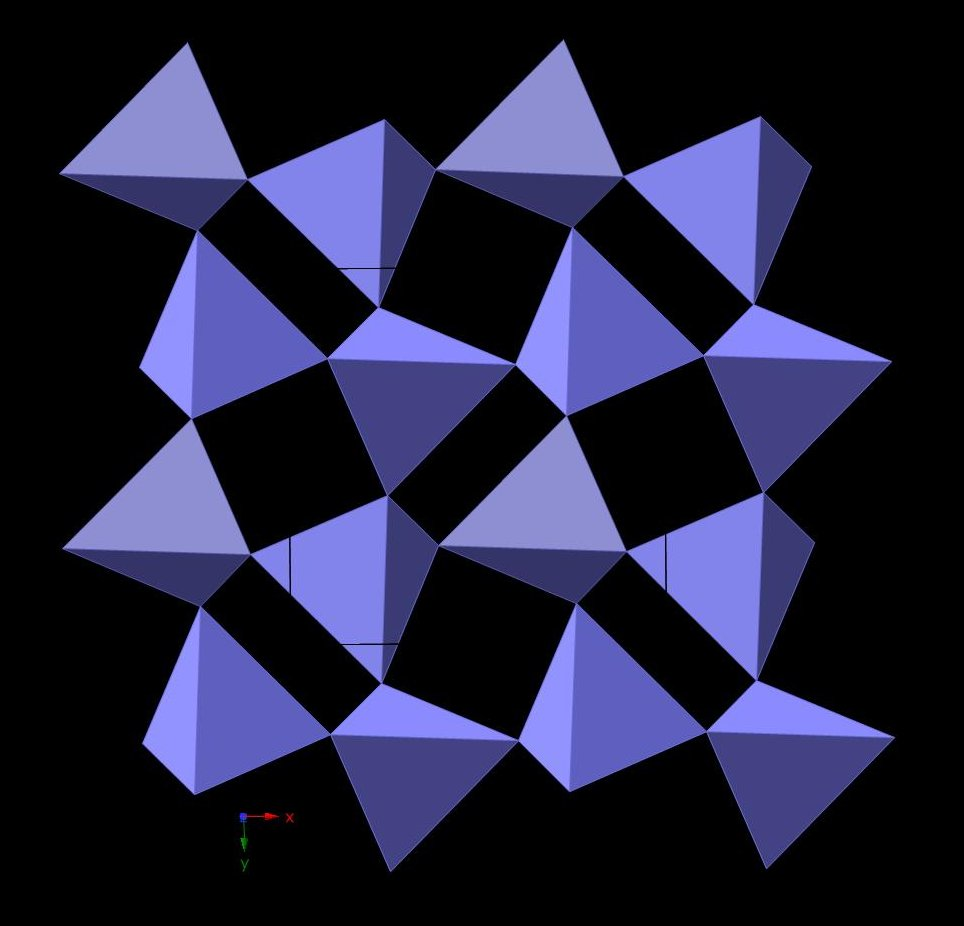
The crystal structure of crystalline α-cristobalite. Locally, the structures of some opals, opal-C, are similar to this.

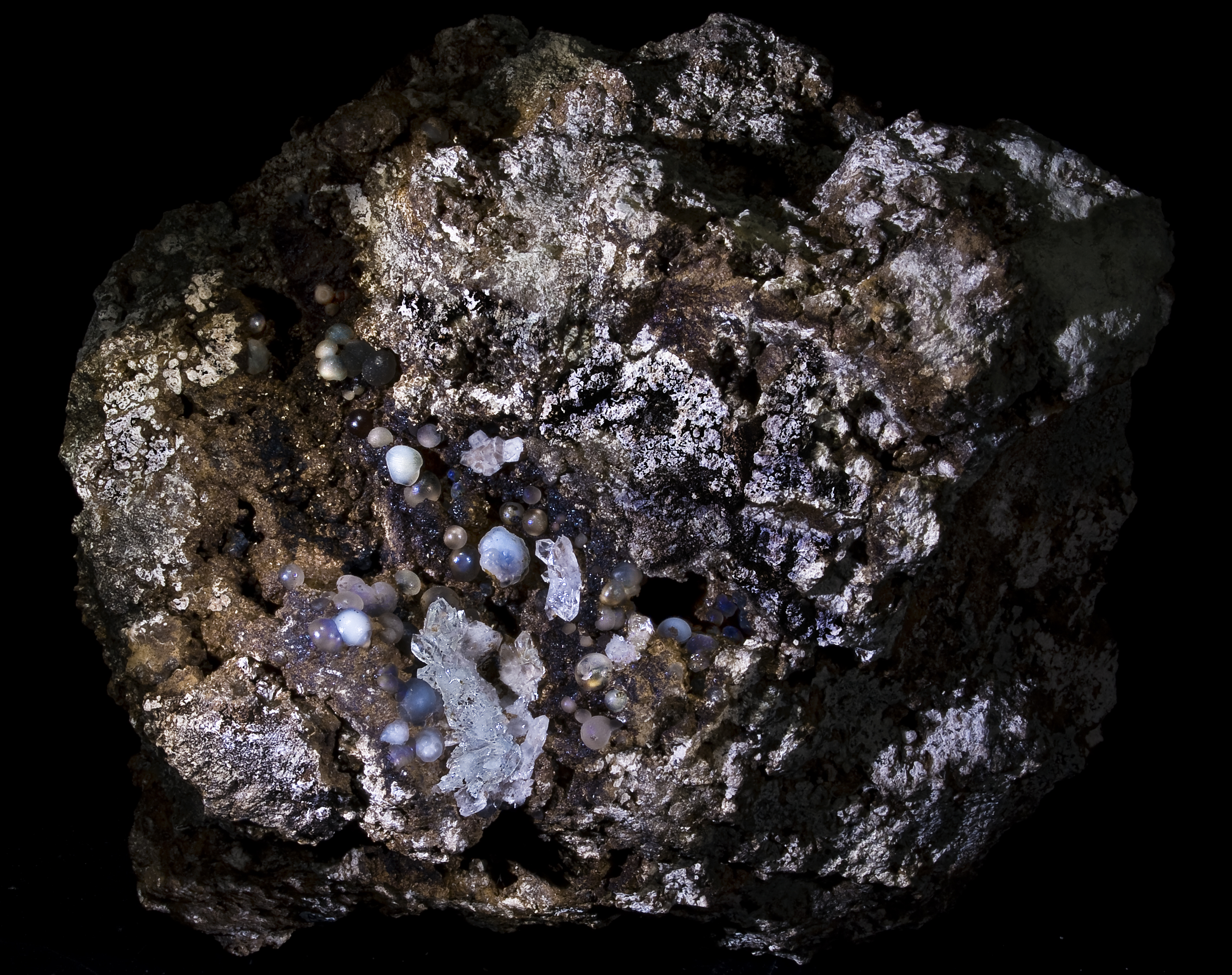
Lussatite (opal-CT)

β-Tridymite, a hexagonal (P6_{3}/mmc) polymorph of silica

The lattice of spheres of opal that cause interference with light is several hundred times larger than the fundamental structure of crystalline silica. As a mineraloid, no unit cell describes the structure of opal. Nevertheless, opals can be roughly divided into those that show no signs of crystalline order (amorphous opal) and those that show signs of the beginning of crystalline order, commonly termed cryptocrystalline or microcrystalline opal. Dehydration experiments and infrared spectroscopy have shown that most of the H_{2}O in the formula of SiO_{2}·nH_{2}O of opals is present in the familiar form of clusters of molecular water. Isolated water molecules, and silanols, structures such as SiOH, generally form a lesser proportion of the total and can reside near the surface or in defects inside the opal.

The structure of low-pressure polymorphs of anhydrous silica consists of frameworks of fully corner bonded tetrahedra of SiO_{4}. The higher temperature polymorphs of silica cristobalite and tridymite are frequently the first to crystallize from amorphous anhydrous silica, and the local structures of microcrystalline opals also appear to be closer to that of cristobalite and tridymite than to quartz. The structures of tridymite and cristobalite are closely related and can be described as hexagonal and cubic close-packed layers. It is therefore possible to have intermediate structures in which the layers are not regularly stacked.

=== Microcrystalline opal ===
Microcrystalline opal or Opal-CT has been interpreted as consisting of clusters of stacked cristobalite and tridymite over very short length scales. The spheres of opal in microcrystalline opal are themselves made up of tiny nanocrystalline blades of cristobalite and tridymite. Microcrystalline opal has occasionally been further subdivided in the literature. Water content may be as high as 10 wt%. Opal-CT, also called lussatine or lussatite, is interpreted as consisting of localized order of α-cristobalite with a lot of stacking disorder. Typical water content is about 1.5 wt%.

=== Noncrystalline opal ===
Two broad categories of noncrystalline opals, sometimes just referred to as "opal-A" ("A" stands for "amorphous"), have been proposed. The first of these is opal-AG consisting of aggregated spheres of silica, with water filling the space in between. Precious opal and potch opal are generally varieties of this, the difference being in the regularity of the sizes of the spheres and their packing. The second "opal-A" is opal-AN or water-containing amorphous silica-glass. Hyalite is another name for this.

Noncrystalline silica in siliceous sediments is reported to gradually transform to opal-CT and then opal-C as a result of diagenesis, due to the increasing overburden pressure in sedimentary rocks, as some of the stacking disorder is removed.

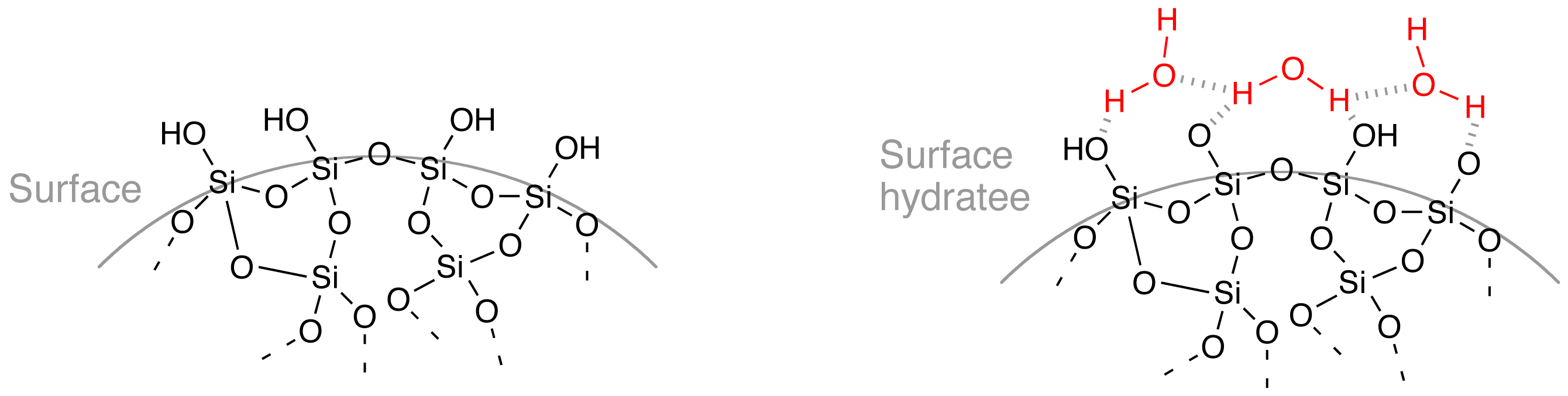
Schematic representation of the hydrated opal surface.

=== Opal surface chemical groups ===
The surface of opal in contact with water is covered by siloxane bonds (≡Si–O–Si≡) and silanol groups (≡Si–OH). This makes the opal surface very hydrophilic and capable of forming numerous hydrogen bonds.

== Etymology ==
The word 'opal' is adapted from the Latin term opalus. The origin of this word in turn is a matter of debate, but most modern references suggest it is adapted from the Sanskrit word úpala meaning 'precious stone'.

As references to the gem are made by Pliny the Elder, one theory attributed the name's origin to Roman mythology: to have been adapted from Ops, the wife of Saturn, and goddess of fertility. (The portion of Saturnalia devoted to Ops was "Opalia", similar to opalus.)

Another common claim was that the term was adapted from the Ancient Greek word, opallios. This word has two meanings, one is related to "seeing" and forms the basis of the English words like "opaque"; the other is "other" as in "alias" and "alter". It is claimed that opalus combined these uses, meaning "to see a change in color". However, historians have noted the first appearances of opallios do not occur until after the Romans had taken over the Greek states in 180 BC and they had previously used the term paederos.

However, the argument for the Sanskrit origin is strong. The term first appears in Roman references around 250 BC, at a time when the opal was valued above all other gems. The opals were supplied by traders from the Bosporus, who claimed the gems were being supplied from India. Before this, the stone was referred to by a variety of names, but these fell from use after 250 BC.

== Historical superstitions ==
In the Middle Ages, opal was considered a stone that could provide great luck because it was believed to possess all the virtues of each gemstone whose color was represented in the color spectrum of the opal. It was also said to grant invisibility. As a result, the opal was seen as the patron gemstone for thieves during the medieval period. Following the publication of Sir Walter Scott's Anne of Geierstein in 1829, opal acquired a less auspicious reputation. In Scott's novel, the Baroness of Arnheim wears an opal talisman with supernatural powers. When a drop of holy water falls on the talisman, the opal turns into a colorless stone and the Baroness dies soon thereafter. Due to the popularity of Scott's novel, people began to associate opals with bad luck and death. Within a year of the publishing of Scott's novel in April 1829, the sale of opals in Europe dropped by 50%, and remained low for the next 20 years or so.

Even as recently as the beginning of the 20th century, it was believed that when a Russian saw an opal among other goods offered for sale, he or she should not buy anything more, as the opal was believed to embody the evil eye.

Opal is considered the birthstone for people born in October.

== Examples ==
- The Olympic Australis, the world's largest and most valuable gem opal, found in Coober Pedy
- The Andamooka Opal, presented to Queen Elizabeth II, also known as the Queen's Opal
- The Addyman plesiosaur from Andamooka, "the finest known opalised skeleton on Earth"
- The Burning of Troy, the now-lost opal presented to Joséphine de Beauharnais by Napoleon I of France and the first named opal
- The Flame Queen Opal
- Opal cameo (jewellery-case) of a profile head of a helmeted warrior, attributed to Wilhelm Schmidt
- The Halley's Comet Opal, the world's largest uncut black opal
- Although the clock faces above the information stand in Grand Central Terminal in New York City are often said to be opal, they are in fact opalescent glass
- The Roebling Opal, Smithsonian Institution
- The Galaxy Opal, listed as the "World's Largest Polished Opal" in the 1992 Guinness Book of Records
- The Rainbow Virgin, "the finest crystal opal specimen ever unearthed"
- The Sea of Opal, the largest black opal in the world
- The Fire of Australia, assumed to be "the finest uncut opal in existence"
- Beverly the Bug, the first known example of an opal with an insect inclusion

== See also ==
- Biogenic silica
- Cacholong – Variety of opal
- Foil opal
- Labradorite
- Opalite – Trade name for opal and moonstone simulants
- Optical phenomena – Observable events that result from the interaction of light and matter
