= List of emeralds by size =

This is a list of emeralds by size.

== Emeralds ==
Emerald is a gemstone and a variety of the mineral beryl (Be_{3}Al_{2}(SiO_{3})_{6}) colored green by trace amounts of chromium and sometimes vanadium. Beryl has a hardness of 7.5–8 on the Mohs scale. Most emeralds are highly included, so their toughness (resistance to breakage) is classified as generally poor. Emerald is a cyclosilicate.

Emeralds in antiquity were mined in Egypt at locations on Mount Smaragdus since 1500 BCE, and India, and Austria since at least the 14th century CE. The Egyptian mines were exploited on an industrial scale by the Roman and Byzantine Empires, and later by Islamic conquerors. Mining ceased with the discovery of the Colombian deposits; only ruins remain.

Colombia is historically an important producer of emeralds, constituting 50–95% of the world production, with the number depending on the year, source and grade. Emerald production in Colombia has increased drastically in the last decade, increasing by 78% from 2000 to 2010. The three main emerald mining areas in Colombia are Muzo, Coscuez and Chivor. Rare "trapiche" emeralds are found in Colombia, distinguished by ray-like spokes of dark impurities.

Zambia is the world's second biggest producer, with the Kagem emerald mine being the world's largest responsible for 25–30% of the world's production of gem-quality stones. In 2019, the Kagem emerald mine produced 42.4 million carats of emeralds. The Zambian emerald sector is an important contributor of tax revenue to the Zambian government.

Zambian emeralds were formed over 500 million years ago; they are geologically much older than emeralds from other origins. As a result, they differ in their formation, composition and key features. Zambian emeralds get their intense green colour from the presence of chromium, iron and beryllium, and they are often lacking in vanadium, resulting in a bluish-green, lively and often eye-clean emerald.

== Notable emeralds ==
| Emerald | Origin | Date | Uncut size | Cut size | Location | Ref |
|---|---|---|---|---|---|---|
| Imboo Emerald | Zambia | 2025 | 11,685 carats (2,337.0 g) | | | |
| Chipembele Emerald | Zambia | 2021 | 7,525 carats (1,505.0 g) | | Israel Diamond Exchange, Eshed – Gemstar | |
| Inkalamu Emerald | Zambia | 2018 | 5,655 carats (1,131.0 g) | | Private Collector | |
| Insofu Emerald | Zambia | 2010 | 6,255 carats (1,251.0 g) | | Jewellery brand | |
| Bahia Emerald | Brazil | 2001 | 180,000 carats (36,000 g) (Note: crystals in host rock) | | Los Angeles County Sheriff's Department | |
| Carolina Emperor | United States | 2009 | 310 carats (62 g) | 64.8 carats (12.96 g) | North Carolina Museum of Natural Sciences, Raleigh | |
| Chalk Emerald | Colombia | | 38.40 carats (7.680 g) | 37.82 carats (7.564 g) | National Museum of Natural History, Washington | |
| Duke of Devonshire Emerald | Colombia | >1831 | 1,383.93 carats (276.786 g) | | Natural History Museum, London | |
| Emerald of Saint Louis | Austria (Note: probably Habachtal) | | | 51.60 carats (10.320 g) | National Museum of Natural History, Paris | |
| Gachalá Emerald | Colombia | 1967 | | 858 carats (171.6 g) | National Museum of Natural History, Washington | |
| Mogul Mughal Emerald | Colombia | 1107 A.H. (Note: (1695–1696 AD)) | | 217.80 carats (43.560 g) | Museum of Islamic Art, Doha, Qatar | |
| Patricia Emerald | Colombia | 1920 | | 632 carats (126.4 g) (Note: dihexagonal (12 sided)) | American Museum of Natural History, New York | |
| Mim Emerald | Colombia | 2014 | | 1,390 carats (278 g) (Note: dihexagonal (12 sided)) | Mim Museum, Beirut | |

== See also ==
- List of gold nuggets by size
- List of sapphires by size
- List of individual gemstones

== Bibliography ==
Notes

References

- Allen, Nick (September 24, 2010). "Judge to decide who owns £250 million Bahia emerald". The Daily Telegraph.
- American Museum of Natural History (2019). "Patricia Emerald". American Museum of Natural History.
- Boulliard, Jean-Claude (2016). 101 minéraux et pierres précieuses qu'il faut avoir vus dans sa vie (in French). PUBLISHER. ISBN 9782100742271. - Total pages: 240
- Gast, Phil (September 1, 2010). "North Carolina emerald: Big, green and very rare". CNN. Archived from the original on September 25, 2013.
- Hurlbut, Cornelius S.; Kammerling, Robert C. (1991). Gemology. Wiley. ISBN 9780471526674. - Total pages: 352
- Smithsonian Institution (2019). "Gachala Emerald". Smithsonian Institution.
- Stancill, Jane (March 17, 2012). "N.C. gems to shine at museum". The News & Observer Publishing Co. Archived from the original on March 27, 2012.
- Weil, Elizabeth (March 2, 2017). "The Curse of the Bahia Emerald, a Giant Green Rock That Ruins Lives". Wired.
