= Bahia Emerald =

Large emerald originated from Bahia, Brazil

The Bahia Emerald is one of the largest emeralds and contains the largest single crystal ever found. The stone, weighing approximately 341 kg (752 lbs) (approximately 189,600 carats) originated from Bahia, Brazil; its emerald crystals embedded in black schist. It narrowly escaped flooding during Hurricane Katrina in 2005 during a period of storage in a warehouse in New Orleans. There was an ownership dispute after it was reported stolen in September 2008 from a secured vault in South El Monte in Los Angeles County, California. The emerald was located and the case and ownership have been settled. The stone has been valued at some $400 million, but the true value is unclear.

== History ==
It originally was mined in 2001, in the beryl mines of north Bahia, Brazil, from which it takes its name. Bahia is an archaic form of Portuguese baía, meaning 'bay' after the bay first seen by European explorers in the 16th century.

Location of Bahia state in Brazil.

After being moved from Brazil to the United States, various attempts were made to sell it without success. There were conflicting claims of ownership. Eventually, the emerald was seized from a gem dealer in Las Vegas and taken into the custody of the Los Angeles Sheriff's Department. After a series of legal actions, Judge John A. Kronstadt of the Los Angeles County Superior Court announced in September 2010 that he would hear the case. Anthony Thomas, among the claimants, claimed to have original ownership of the gem including claimants who have paid more than $1.3 million for the emerald. A trial date was set for January 21, 2013, in the Los Angeles County Court. On January 29, 2014, Judge Kronstadt issued a ruling rejecting the claims of Anthony Thomas, leaving the determination of the remaining claimants for a future trial.

After a trial on March 30, 2015, in the Los Angeles Superior Court, the Honorable Michael Johnson, the judge who succeeded Judge Kronstadt in the civil case, entered a final order on June 23, 2015 determining and ruling that FM Holdings, LLC was the bona fide purchaser of the Bahia Emerald and that title to the Bahia Emerald is now held solely and exclusively by FM Holdings, LLC by a series of agency relationships and lawful transactions. All other claimants to the Bahia Emerald have either been previously dismissed, e.g., Tony Thomas, or settled their claims leaving FM Holdings, LLC, as the sole and exclusive owner of the Bahia Emerald by Judge Johnson's June 23, 2015, ruling.

Despite the case being settled, on June 25, 2015, U.S. District Court Judge Colleen Kollar-Kotelly, on a request by the Department of Justice, issued a restraining order protecting the stone, in which not even the owners of the stone could see, move, or sell it. Judge Kollar-Kotelly argued that the emerald was subject to forfeiture in Brazil, where prosecutors in an upcoming criminal trial alleged that two men knowingly received the stolen emerald and illegally smuggled it out of the country.

== Return to Brazil ==
After years of legal disputes in U.S. courts, on 21 November 2024, U.S. federal Judge Reggie Walton of the District Court for the District of Columbia ruled that the Bahia Emerald should be returned to Brazil. Despite efforts by American gem dealers to delay the decision, arguing they needed more time to negotiate a settlement with the Brazilian government, Judge Walton determined that Brazil's rightful ownership of the smuggled gemstone outweighed any claims of American ownership. In his ruling, he stated, "The Court has concluded that the Intervenors' positions are insufficient to prohibit the return of the Emerald to Brazil [...] The Court must therefore enforce the Brazilian Forfeiture Judgment of the Bahia Emerald."

== See also ==
- List of individual gemstones
- List of emeralds by size
