= Mogul Mughal Emerald =

Individual emerald

- Type of stone: Emerald
- Weight: 217.80 carats (43.560 g)
- Dimensions: 2.06 in × 1.56 in × 1.56 in (5.2 cm × 4.0 cm × 4.0 cm)
- Color: Emerald green
- Country of origin: Colombia
- Original owner: Mughal Empire
- Owner: Museum of Islamic Art, Doha
- Estimated value: £1,543,750

The Mogul Mughal Emerald is one of the largest emeralds known.

Auction house Christie's described it as follows:

The rectangular-cut emerald known as 'The Mogul Mughal' weighing 217.80 carats, the obverse engraved with Shi'a invocations in elegant naskh script, dated 1107 A.H., the reverse carved all over with foliate decoration, the central rosette flanked by single large poppy flowers, with a line of three smaller poppy flowers either side, the bevelled edges carved with cross pattern incisions and herringbone decoration, each of the four sides drilled for attachments, 2.06 by 1.56 by 1.56 inches (5.2 by 4.0 by 4.0 cm).

Originally mined in Colombia, it was sold in India, where emeralds were much desired by the rulers of the Mughal Empire. The Mogul Mughal is unique among Mughal emeralds in bearing a date – 1107 A.H. (1695–1696 AD) – which is within the reign of Aurangzeb, the sixth emperor. However, the Mughal rulers were Sunni, whereas the inscription – a heterodox Salawat dedicated to Hassan ibn Ali and Husayn ibn Ali also known as 'Nad e Ali' – is Shi'a, making it likely that it belonged not to Aurangzeb, but to one of his courtiers or officers.

It was sold on 27 September 2001 by Christie's for £1,543,750, including buyer's premium. As of 17 December 2008, it was in the possession of the Museum of Islamic Art, Doha, Qatar.

== See also ==
- Colombian emeralds
- Chivor
- Muzo
- List of individual gemstones
- List of emeralds by size
