= Carroll Chatham =

American chemist

Carroll Chatham (1914–1983) was an American chemist who developed the flux method for synthesizing emeralds. He was the first person to develop a method for creating man-made emeralds that was able to make them commercially available. He founded the jewelry company Chatham which is still selling Chatham emeralds to this day.

== Early life ==
Carroll Chatham grew up in San Francisco, California and he developed an interest in gemology at an early age. As a teenager, he was already experimenting in his garage. His goal was to synthesize diamonds but after an explosion during one of these attempts, which caused his father to make Chatham change his experiments. This change led him to attempt to synthesize emeralds instead, but this included the challenge of there not being a known method for developing emeralds like the flame fusion method used for creating rubies and sapphires. His first successful experiment was the development of a colorless gem in 1930. This gem was made of beryl, which is a significant development since emeralds are a part of the beryl family. Only 5 years later Chatham synthesized a 1-carat emerald.

== Career ==
Chatham attended the California Institute of Technology and received a chemistry degree in 1938. After graduating he spent a few years in the industry before owning his own laboratory. This laboratory is where he continued to work on developing his synthetic gems. Using this lab, he was able to create the first commercially marketable emerald. These Chatham emeralds are still sold to this day and because of his flux method, they do not have the inclusions or fractures that are common in natural emeralds. He then built up his Chatham jewelry company and continued to develop more synthetic gems. These gems include rubies and sapphires.

== Legacy ==
Chatham was not the first person to make man-made gems, but he was the first to create emeralds. Before him, both rubies and sapphires were created using the Verneuil method, developed by French chemist Auguste Victor Louis Verneuil. This method involves melting aluminum oxide at high temperatures, adding colors so that they take on the colors of the natural gems, and then allowing them to cool so that form the natural crystal structure. This is a well-known process that is in stark contrast to Chatham's flux method. He guarded his flux recipe carefully since it was the key to the emeralds forming properly. This is because before he discovered the flux method, it was not possible to make synthetic emeralds because the different materials had different melting points which caused them to not combine in order to form the gem. This method involves beryl seed crystals being suspended in the flux solution while it crystalizes into the full gem. This is not a quick process and can take a year for the crystals to grow to a point where they become marketable.

Carroll Chatham died in 1983 but before his death, his sons Tom and John Chatham took over running the company. John took over the laboratory and manufacturing side of the company while Tom works on the marketing end. They continue the work that their father started as a boy and after Carroll's death, the Chatham company developed its first synthetic diamond which was Carroll's dream since he was a boy that caused an explosion in his garage lab.
