= O. Roy Chalk =

American businessman

Oscar Roy Chalk (June 7, 1907 – December 1, 1995) was a New York entrepreneur who owned real estate, airlines, bus companies, newspapers and a rail line that hauled bananas in Central America. His diverse holdings included DC Transit, Trans Caribbean Airways, the Houdon bust of Thomas Jefferson now at Monticello, the Chalk Emerald, and the New York Spanish-language newspapers El Diario de Nueva York and La Prensa, merging them into El Diario La Prensa.

== Early life ==
Chalk was born in London, England and emigrated to the United States at age three. He grew up in the Bronx, where his neighbors included Ira and George Gershwin and Lou Gehrig.

He graduated from New York University and its law school. He learned the real estate business and bought several apartment buildings.

== Business career ==
He started Trans Caribbean Airways in 1945 for $60,000, with two DC-4s. It was through the airline that in the mid-1960s he eventually purchased the 800-mile rail line, International Railways of Central America, that transported bananas in Central America. He later purchased a banana plantation, which he owned for a time. Chalk sold his airline to American Airlines on March 3, 1971, in exchange for stock and became the single largest shareholder.

He purchased the Washington, D.C. transit system on August 15, 1956, for $13.5 million, renaming it DC Transit, and in 1959 attempted to purchase New York City's transit system, but city officials rejected the offer after weeks of serious consideration.

Chalk owned the Georgetown Car Barn in Washington, D.C., adjacent to the famous steps where the part of "The Exorcist" was filmed. The building was a streetcar shop erected in 1895 that supported the Capital Transit Company system, which circulated through the District of Columbia. By Public Law 389, enacted by the United States Congress, Chalk was directed to replace all streetcar operations with buses, which was completed on January 28, 1962. On January 14, 1973 WMATA condemned DC Transit and its sister company, the Washington, Virginia and Maryland Coach Company and acquired their assets for $38.2 million. He retained ownership of the Georgetown Car Barn, however, which had been converted into office space between 1957 and 1960. Chalk owned the building until 1992 when the Minneapolis-based Lutheran Brotherhood took possession of the property in a foreclosure. Developer Douglas Jemal bought it in May 1997.

Chalk owned El Diario-La Prensa until the New York-based Spanish daily was sold to the Gannett Company in 1981.

Chalk helped the newly formed Russia draft its first constitution after splitting from the USSR. Chalk's work consisted in analyzing early drafts of the United States constitution and noting the changes from draft to draft for the newly formed Russian republic constitution committee.

Chalk was a founder of the American-Korean Foundation and as a result the South Korean Government gave him its National Medal of Honor.

The 1789 plaster bust of Thomas Jefferson by Jean-Antoine Houdon now displayed at Monticello was owned for many years by Chalk. That image appeared on the U.S. nickel beginning in 1938. The bust set a world auction record for a pre-20th-century sculpture when it was sold by Christie's in New York on May 29, 1987.

Recently, Chalk was discovered to have owned for more than 41 years a 1785 painting by the artist Nicolas Benjamin Delapierre that may be the earliest known portrait of Thomas Jefferson.

In 1970, Chalk donated several former DC Transit streetcars to the National Capital Trolley Museum in Colesville, Maryland.

Chalk donated the famous 37.82-carat "Chalk Emerald" ring to the Smithsonian Institution's National Museum of Natural History in 1972. It is prominently displayed next to the "Hope Diamond" in the museum's Washington Mall building.

Chalk was chairman of the United Nations finance committee for several years and was a prominent fund raiser for the Democratic Party in the 1960s. He also helped raise money for the United Negro College Fund and served on the Georgetown University Board of Regents.

He died from cancer in a New York hospital at the age of 88.
