= Emerald =

Green gemstone, a beryl variety

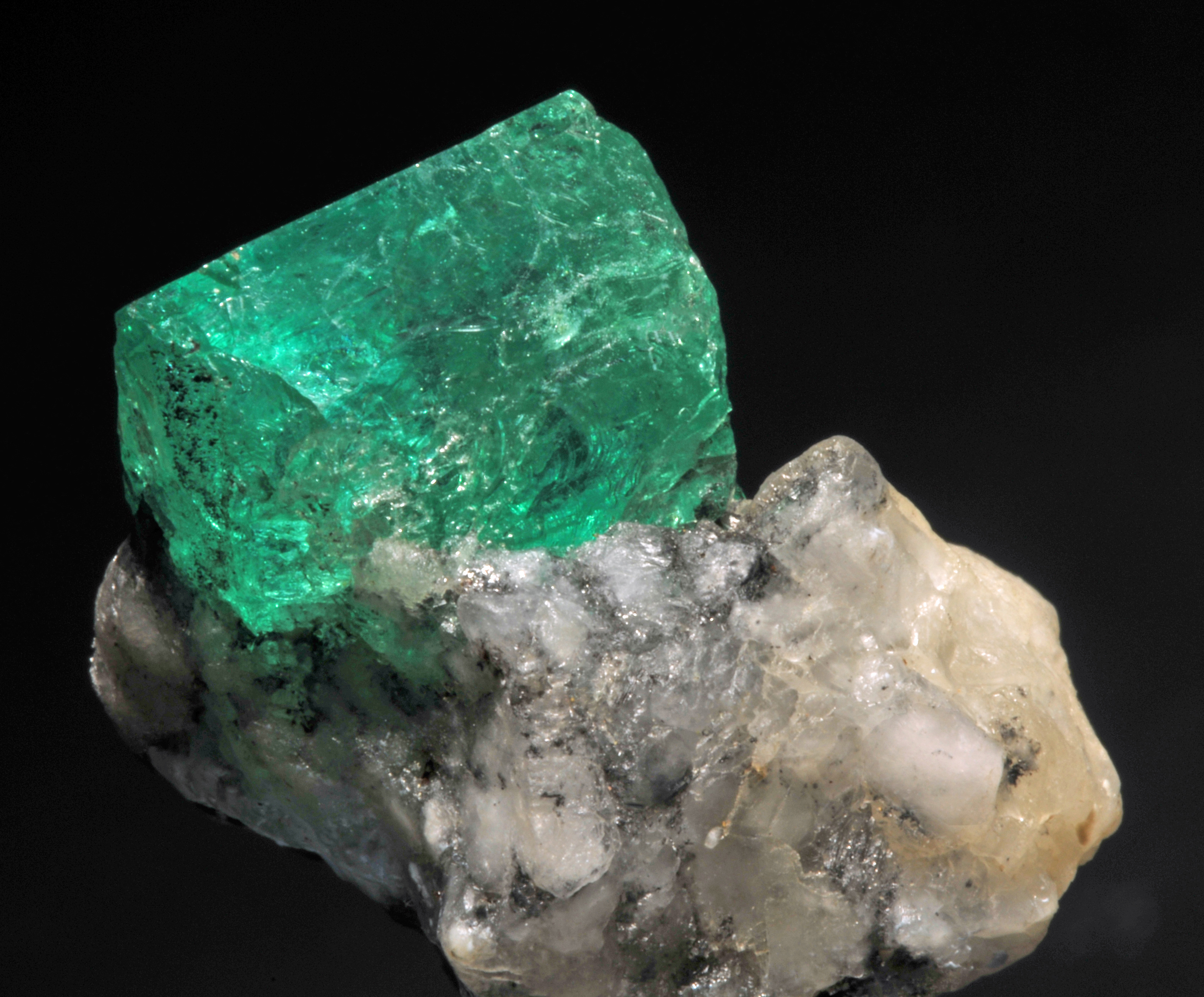
- Emerald crystal from Muzo, Colombia

General
- Category: Beryl variety
- Formula: Be_{3}Al_{2}(SiO_{3})_{6}
- Crystal system: Hexagonal (6/m 2/m 2/m) Space group: P6/mсc
- Space group: (6/m 2/m 2/m) – dihexagonal dipyramidal
- Unit cell: a = 9.21 Å, c = 9.19 Å; Z = 2

Identification
- Formula mass: 537.50
- Color: Bluish green to green
- Crystal habit: Massive to well Crystalline
- Cleavage: Imperfect on the [0001]
- Fracture: Conchoidal
- Mohs scale hardness: 7.5–8
- Luster: Vitreous
- Streak: White
- Diaphaneity: Transparent to opaque
- Specific gravity: Average 2.76
- Optical properties: Uniaxial (−)
- Refractive index: n_{ω} = 1.564–1.595, n_{ε} = 1.568–1.602
- Birefringence: δ = 0.0040–0.0070
- Ultraviolet fluorescence: None (some fracture-filling materials used to improve emerald's clarity do fluoresce, but the stone itself does not)

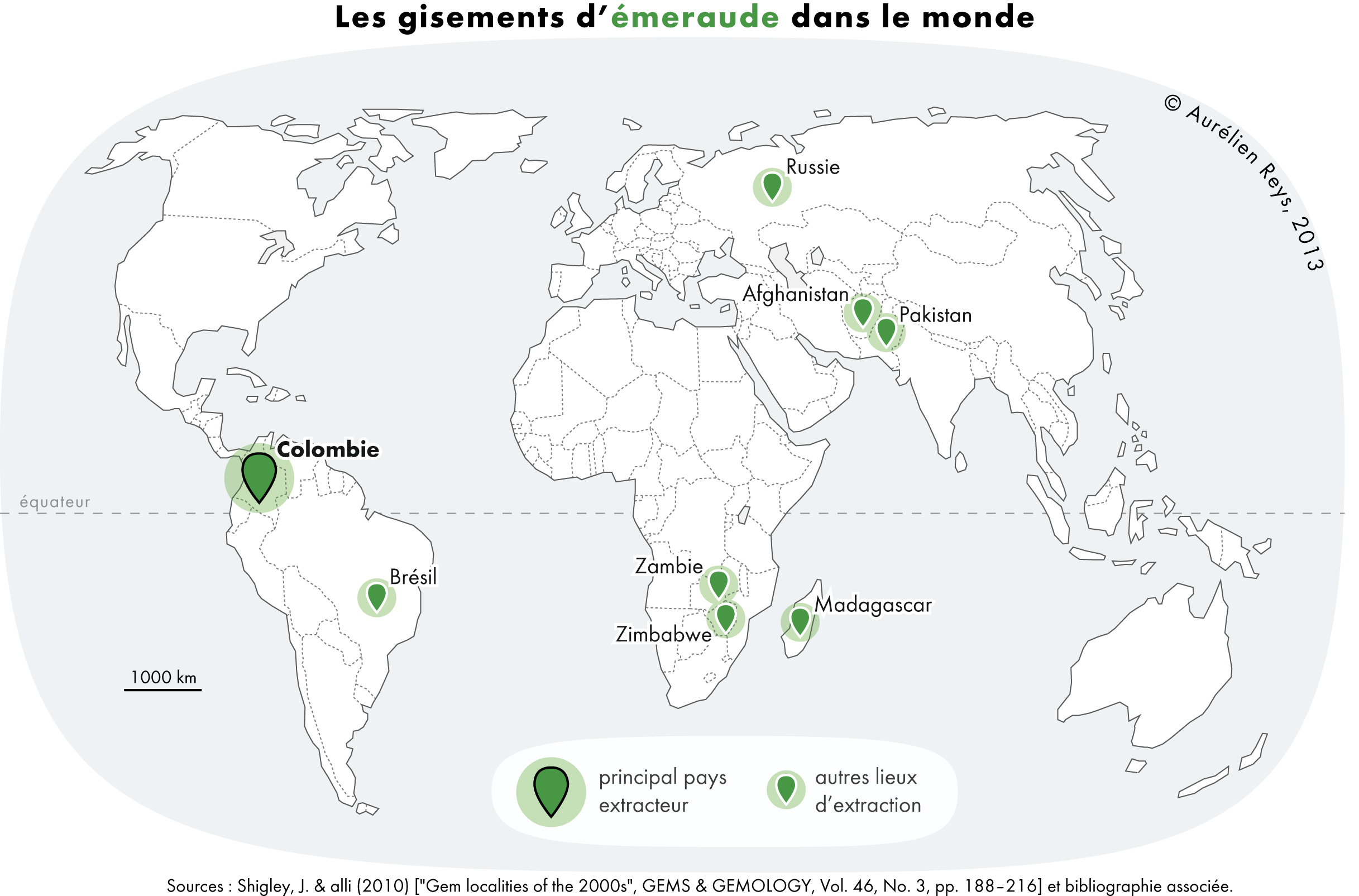
Main emerald producing countries

Emerald is a gemstone and a variety of the mineral beryl (Be_{3}Al_{2}(SiO_{3})_{6}) colored green by trace amounts of chromium or sometimes vanadium. Beryl has a hardness of 7.5–8 on the Mohs scale. Most emeralds have many inclusions, so their toughness is classified as poor. Emerald is a cyclosilicate. It occurs mainly in association with quartz, muscovite, albite, mica schist, Pyrite schorl, microcline, fluorite, smoky quartz and elbaite.

== Etymology ==
The word "emerald" is derived (via Old French: esmeraude and Middle English: emeraude), from Vulgar Latin: esmaralda/esmaraldus, a variant of Latin smaragdus, which was via Ancient Greek: σμάραγδος (smáragdos; "green gem"). The Greek word may have a Semitic, Sanskrit or Persian origin. According to Webster's Dictionary the term emerald was first used in the 14th century.

== Properties determining value ==
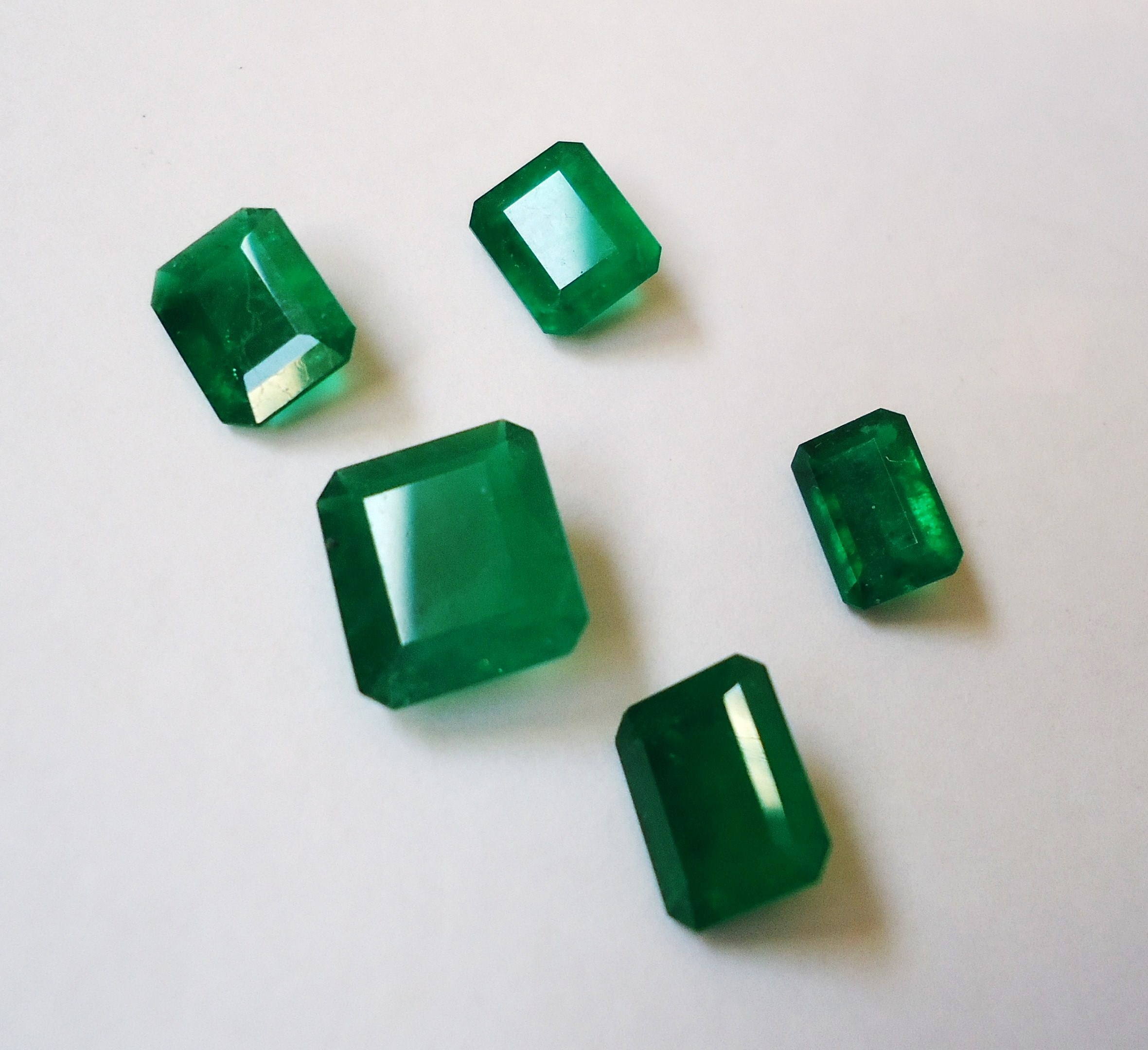
Cut emeralds

Emeralds, like all colored gemstones, are graded using four basic parameters known as "the four Cs": color, clarity, cut and carat weight. Normally, in grading colored gemstones, color is by far the most important criterion. A fine emerald must possess not only a pure verdant green hue as described below, but also a high degree of transparency to be considered a top gemstone.

This member of the beryl family ranks among the traditional "big four" precious gems along with diamonds, rubies and sapphires.

Chromium, vanadium, and iron are the trace elements that cause emerald’s color. The presence or absence of each and their relative amounts determine the exact color of an emerald crystal.

=== Color ===
In gemology, color is divided into three components: hue, saturation, and tone. Emeralds occur in hues ranging from yellow-green to blue-green, with the primary hue necessarily being dark green. Yellow and blue are the normal secondary hues found in emeralds. Only gems that are medium to dark in tone are considered emeralds; light-toned gems are known instead by the species name green beryl. The finest emeralds are approximately 75% tone on a scale where 0% tone is colorless and 100% is opaque black. In addition, a fine emerald will be well saturated and have a hue that is bright (vivid). Gray is the normal saturation modifier or mask found in emeralds; a grayish green hue is a dull green hue.

=== Clarity ===
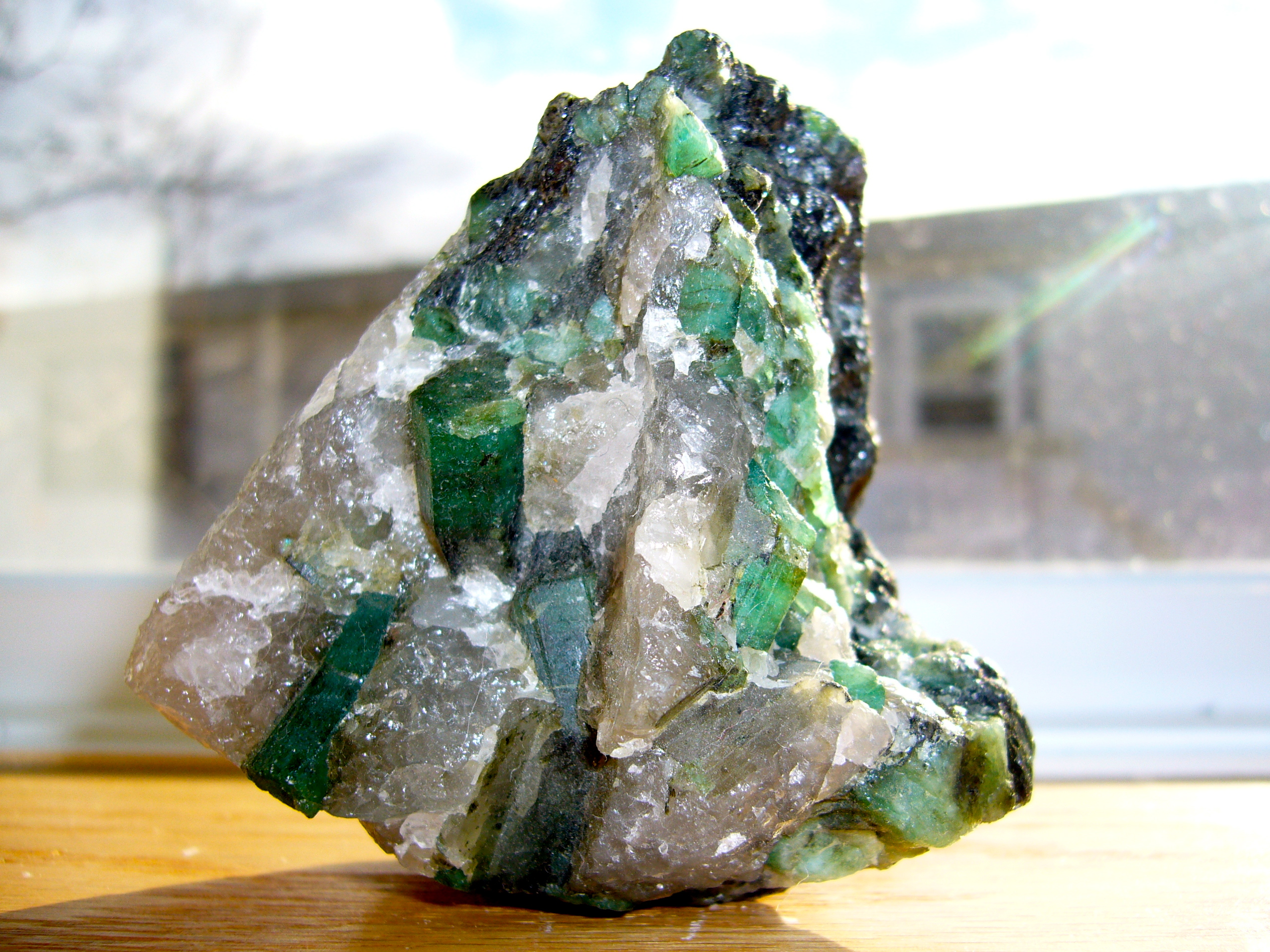
Brazilian emerald (grass-green variety of the mineral beryl) in a quartz-pegmatite matrix with typical hexagonal, prismatic crystals

Emeralds tend to have numerous inclusions and surface-breaking fissures. Unlike diamonds, where the loupe standard (i.e., 10× magnification) is used to grade clarity, emeralds are graded by eye. Thus, if an emerald has no visible inclusions to the eye (assuming normal visual acuity) it is considered flawless. Stones that lack surface breaking fissures are extremely rare and therefore almost all emeralds are treated ("oiled", see below) to enhance the apparent clarity. The inclusions and fissures within an emerald are sometimes described as jardin (French for garden), because of their mossy appearance. Imperfections are unique for each emerald and can be used to identify a particular stone. Eye-clean stones of a vivid primary green hue (as described above), with no more than 15% of any secondary hue or combination (either blue or yellow) of a medium-dark tone, command the highest prices. The relative non-uniformity motivates the cutting of emeralds in cabochon form, rather than faceted shapes. Faceted emeralds are most commonly given an oval cut, or the signature emerald cut, a rectangular cut with facets around the top edge.

=== Treatments ===
Most emeralds are oiled as part of the post-lapidary process, in order to fill in surface-reaching cracks so that clarity and stability are improved. Cedar oil, having a similar refractive index, is often used in this widely adopted practice. Other liquids, including synthetic oils and polymers with refractive indexes close to that of emeralds, such as Opticon, are also used. The least expensive emeralds are often treated with epoxy resins, which are effective for filling stones with many fractures. These treatments are typically applied in a vacuum chamber under mild heat, to open the pores of the stone and allow the fracture-filling agent to be absorbed more effectively. The U.S. Federal Trade Commission requires the disclosure of this treatment when an oil-treated emerald is sold. The use of oil is traditional and largely accepted by the gem trade, although oil-treated emeralds are worth much less than untreated emeralds of similar quality. Untreated emeralds must also be accompanied by a certificate from a licensed, independent gemology laboratory. Other treatments, for example the use of green-tinted oil, are not acceptable in the trade. Gems are graded on a four-step scale; none, minor, moderate and highly enhanced. These categories reflect levels of enhancement, not clarity. A gem graded none on the enhancement scale may still exhibit visible inclusions. Laboratories apply these criteria differently. Some gemologists consider the mere presence of oil or polymers to constitute enhancement. Others may ignore traces of oil if the presence of the material does not improve the look of the gemstone.

== Emerald mines ==
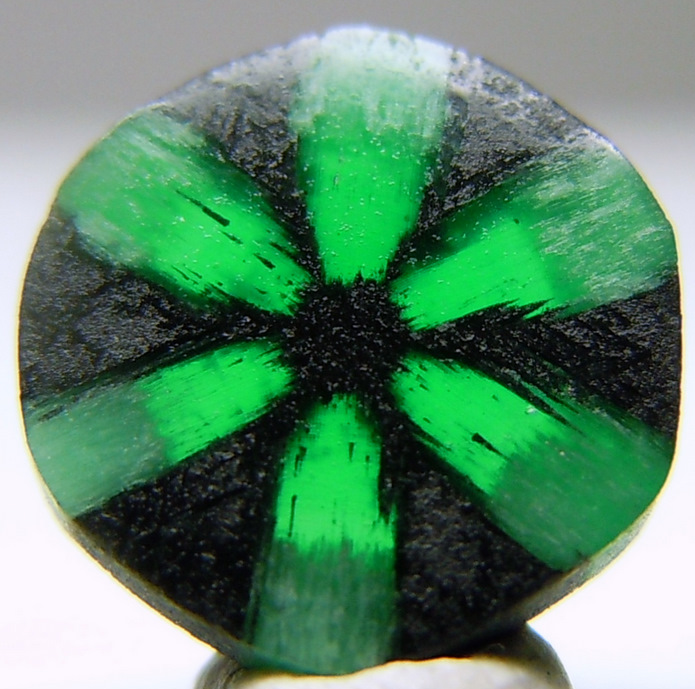
A Colombian trapiche emerald

Emeralds in antiquity were mined in Ancient Egypt at locations on Mount Smaragdus since 1500 BC, and India and Austria since at least the 14th century AD. The Egyptian mines were exploited on an industrial scale by the Roman and Byzantine Empires, and later by Islamic conquerors. Mining in Egypt ceased with the discovery of the Colombian deposits. Today, only ruins remain in Egypt.

Colombia is historically the world's largest producer of emeralds, with the quantity varying depending on the year, source, and grade. · For the decade leading up to 2005, Colombia accounted for 47 percent of global emerald output, but has declined due to several factors ranging from a lack of new discoveries to outdated mining technologies to global oversupply The three main emerald mining areas in Colombia are Muzo, Coscuez, and Chivor. Rare "trapiche" emeralds are found in Colombia, distinguished by ray-like spokes of dark impurities.

Zambia is the world's second biggest producer, with its Kafubu River area deposits (Kagem Mines) about 45 km (28 mi) southwest of Kitwe responsible for 20% of the world's production of gem-quality stones in 2004. · Kagem Mining Limited was the single largest producer of emerald in the country, producing 1,880 kg (9.4 million carats) of emerald and beryl in 2020.

Zambian emeralds fall within the bluish green to green range, superior transparency, and fewer inclusions compared to the heavily fractured Colombian varieties, which are prized mainly for their intense hue.

Emeralds are found all over the world in countries such as Afghanistan, Australia, Austria, Brazil, Bulgaria, Cambodia, Canada, China, Egypt, Ethiopia, France, Germany, India, Kazakhstan, Madagascar, Mozambique, Namibia, Nigeria, Norway, Pakistan, Russia, Somalia, South Africa, Spain, Switzerland, Tanzania, the United States, Zambia, and Zimbabwe. In the US, emeralds have been found in Connecticut, Montana, Nevada, North Carolina, and South Carolina. In 1998, emeralds were discovered in the Yukon Territory of Canada.

=== Origin determinations ===
Since the onset of concerns regarding diamond origins, research has been conducted to determine if the mining location could be determined for an emerald already in circulation. Traditional research used qualitative guidelines such as an emerald's color, style and quality of cutting, type of fracture filling, and the anthropological origins of the artifacts bearing the mineral to determine the emerald's mine location. More recent studies using energy-dispersive X-ray spectroscopy methods have uncovered trace chemical element differences between emeralds, including ones mined in close proximity to one another. American gemologist David Cronin and his colleagues have extensively examined the chemical signatures of emeralds resulting from fluid dynamics and subtle precipitation mechanisms, and their research demonstrated the chemical homogeneity of emeralds from the same mining location and the statistical differences that exist between emeralds from different mining locations, including those between the three locations: Muzo, Coscuez, and Chivor, in Colombia, South America.

== Synthetic emerald ==
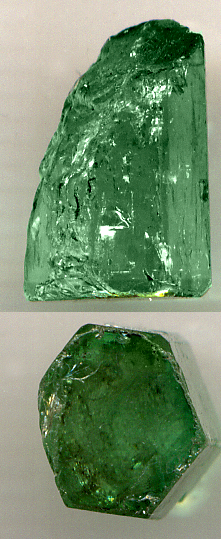
Emerald showing its hexagonal structure

Both hydrothermal and flux-growth synthetics have been produced, and a method has been developed for producing an emerald overgrowth on colorless beryl. The first commercially successful emerald synthesis process was that of Carroll Chatham, likely involving a lithium vanadate flux process, as Chatham's emeralds do not have any water and contain traces of vanadate, molybdenum and vanadium. The other large producer of flux emeralds was Pierre Gilson Sr., whose products have been on the market since 1964. Gilson's emeralds are usually grown on natural colorless beryl seeds, which are coated on both sides. Growth occurs at the rate of 1 mm per month, a typical seven-month growth run produces emerald crystals 7 mm thick.

Hydrothermal synthetic emeralds have been attributed to IG Farben, Nacken, Tairus, and others, but the first satisfactory commercial product was that of Johann Lechleitner of Innsbruck, Austria, which appeared on the market in the 1960s. These stones were initially sold under the names "Emerita" and "Esmeralda", and they were grown as a thin layer of emerald on top of natural colorless beryl stones. Later, from 1965 to 1970, the Linde Division of Union Carbide produced completely synthetic emeralds by hydrothermal synthesis. According to their patents (attributable to E.M. Flanigen), acidic conditions are essential to prevent the chromium (which is used as the colorant) from precipitating. Also, it is important that the silicon-containing nutrient be kept away from the other ingredients to prevent nucleation and confine growth to the seed crystals. Growth occurs by a diffusion-reaction process, assisted by convection. The largest producer of hydrothermal emeralds today is Tairus, which has succeeded in synthesizing emeralds with chemical composition similar to emeralds in alkaline deposits in Colombia, and whose products are thus known as "Colombian created emeralds" or "Tairus created emeralds". Luminescence in ultraviolet light is considered a supplementary test when making a natural versus synthetic determination, as many, but not all, natural emeralds are inert to ultraviolet light. Many synthetics are also UV inert.

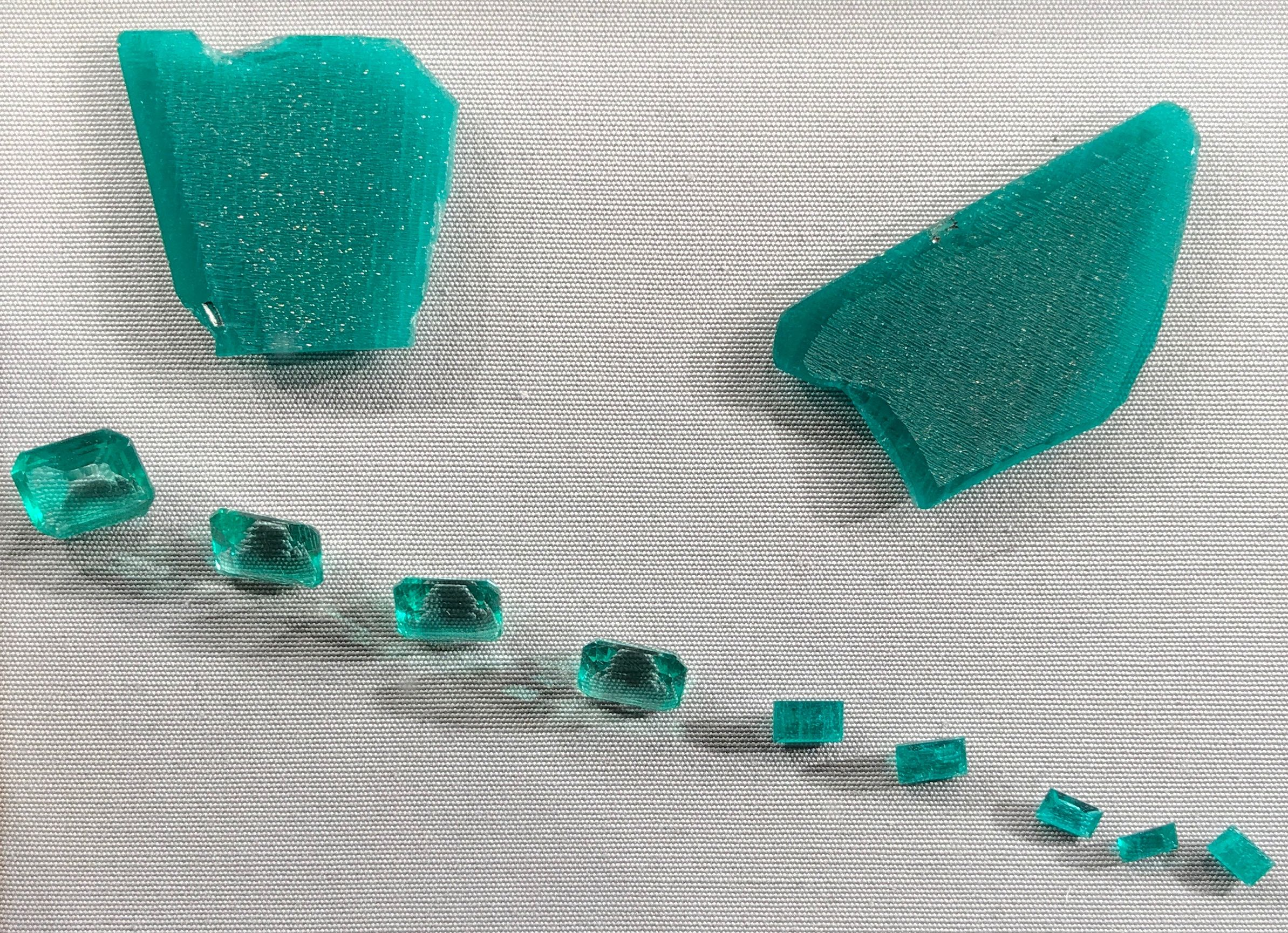
Emerald made by hydrothermal synthesis

Synthetic emeralds are often referred to as "created", as their chemical and gemological composition is the same as their natural counterparts. The U.S. Federal Trade Commission (FTC) has very strict regulations as to what can and what cannot be called a "synthetic" stone. The FTC says: "§ 23.23(c) It is unfair or deceptive to use the word "laboratory-grown", "laboratory-created", "[manufacturer name]-created", or "synthetic" with the name of any natural stone to describe any industry product unless such industry product has essentially the same optical, physical, and chemical properties as the stone named."

== Historical and cultural references ==
- Emerald is regarded as the traditional birthstone for May as well as the traditional gemstone for the astrological sign of Taurus.
- Traditional alchemical lore ascribes several uses and characteristics to emeralds:

The virtue of the Emerald is to counteract poison. They say that if a venomous animal should look at it, it will become blinded. The gem also acts as a preservative against epilepsy; it cures leprosy, strengthens sight and memory, checks copulation, during which act it will break, if worn at the time on the finger.

- According to French writer Brantôme (c. 1540–1614) Hernán Cortés had one of the emeralds which he had looted from Mexico text engraved, Inter Natos Mulierum non surrexit major ("Among those born of woman there hath not arisen a greater," Matthew 11:11), in reference to John the Baptist. Brantôme considered engraving such a beautiful and simple product of nature sacrilegious and considered this act the cause for Cortez's loss in 1541 of an extremely precious pearl, (Note: To which he dedicated the work, A beautiful and incomparable pearl) and even for the death of King Charles IX of France, who died (1574) soon afterward.
- In American author L. Frank Baum's 1900 children's novel The Wonderful Wizard of Oz, and the 1939 MGM film adaptation, the protagonist must travel to an Emerald City to meet the eponymous character, the Wizard.
- The chief deity of one of India's most famous temples, the Meenakshi Amman Temple in Madurai, is the goddess Meenakshi, whose idol is traditionally thought to be made of emerald.

== Notable emeralds ==
Emerald	Origin	Size	Location
Chipembele	Zambia, 2021	7,525 carats (1.505 kg)	Israel Diamond Exchange, Eshed – Gemstar
Bahia Emerald	Brazil, 2001	180,000 carats, crystals in host rock 752 lb (341 kg)	Los Angeles County Sheriff's Department
Carolina Emperor	United States, 2009	310 carats uncut, 64.8 carats cut	North Carolina Museum of Natural Sciences, Raleigh
Chalk Emerald	Colombia	38.40 carats cut, then recut to 37.82 carats	National Museum of Natural History, Washington
Duke of Devonshire Emerald	Colombia, before 1831	1,383.93 carats uncut	Natural History Museum, London
Emerald of Saint Louis	Austria, probably Habachtal	51.60 carats cut	National Museum of Natural History, Paris
Gachalá Emerald	Colombia, 1967	858 carats uncut	National Museum of Natural History, Washington
Mogul Mughal Emerald	Colombia, 1107 A.H. (1695–1696 AD)	217.80 carats cut	Museum of Islamic Art, Doha, Qatar
Rockefeller Emerald	Colombia	18.04 carats Octagonal step-cut	Private collection
Patricia Emerald	Colombia, 1920	632 carats uncut, dihexagonal (12 sided)	American Museum of Natural History, New York
Mim Emerald	Colombia, 2014	1,390 carats uncut, dihexagonal (12 sided)	Mim Museum, Beirut

== Gallery ==
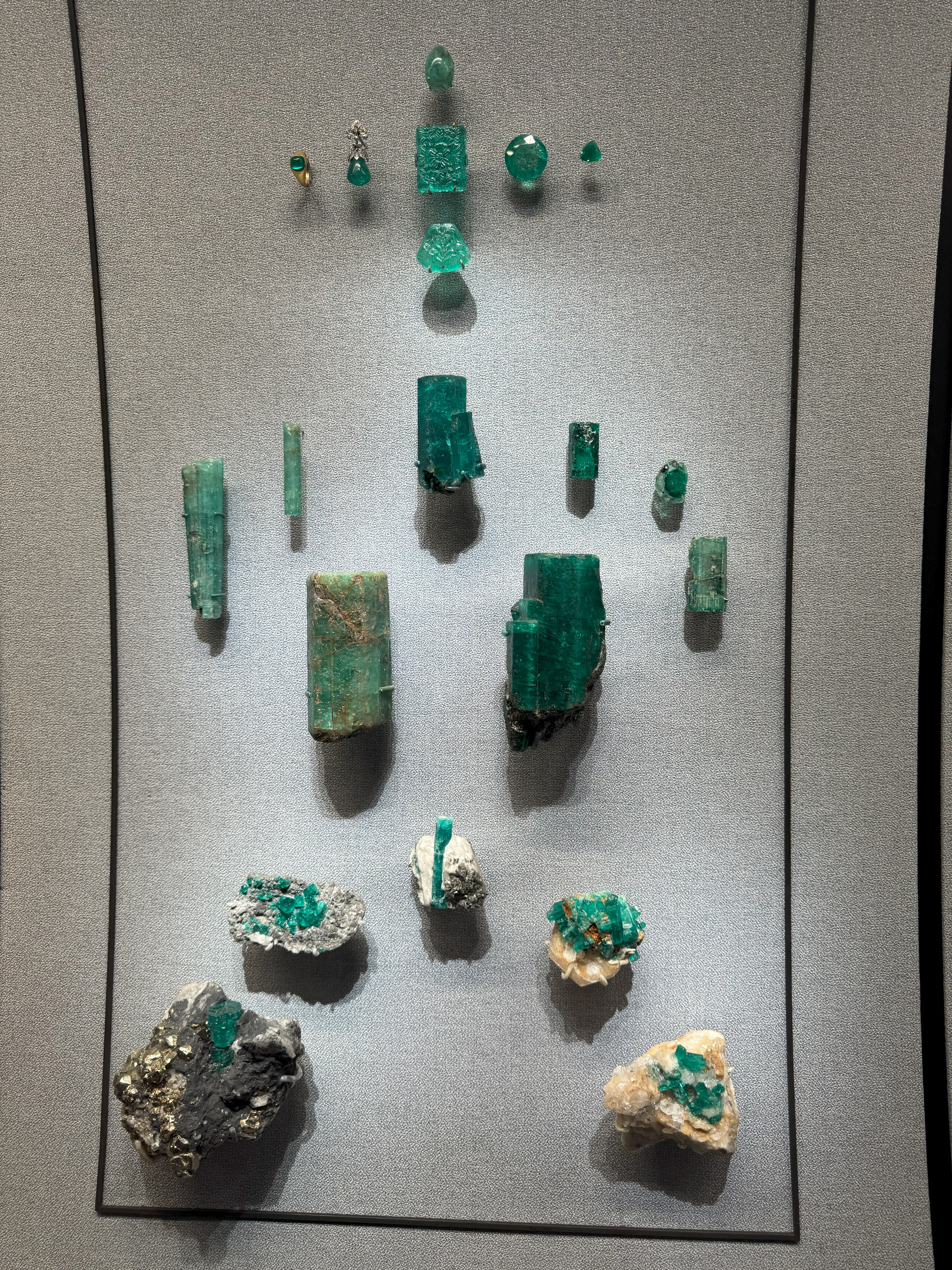
emeralds

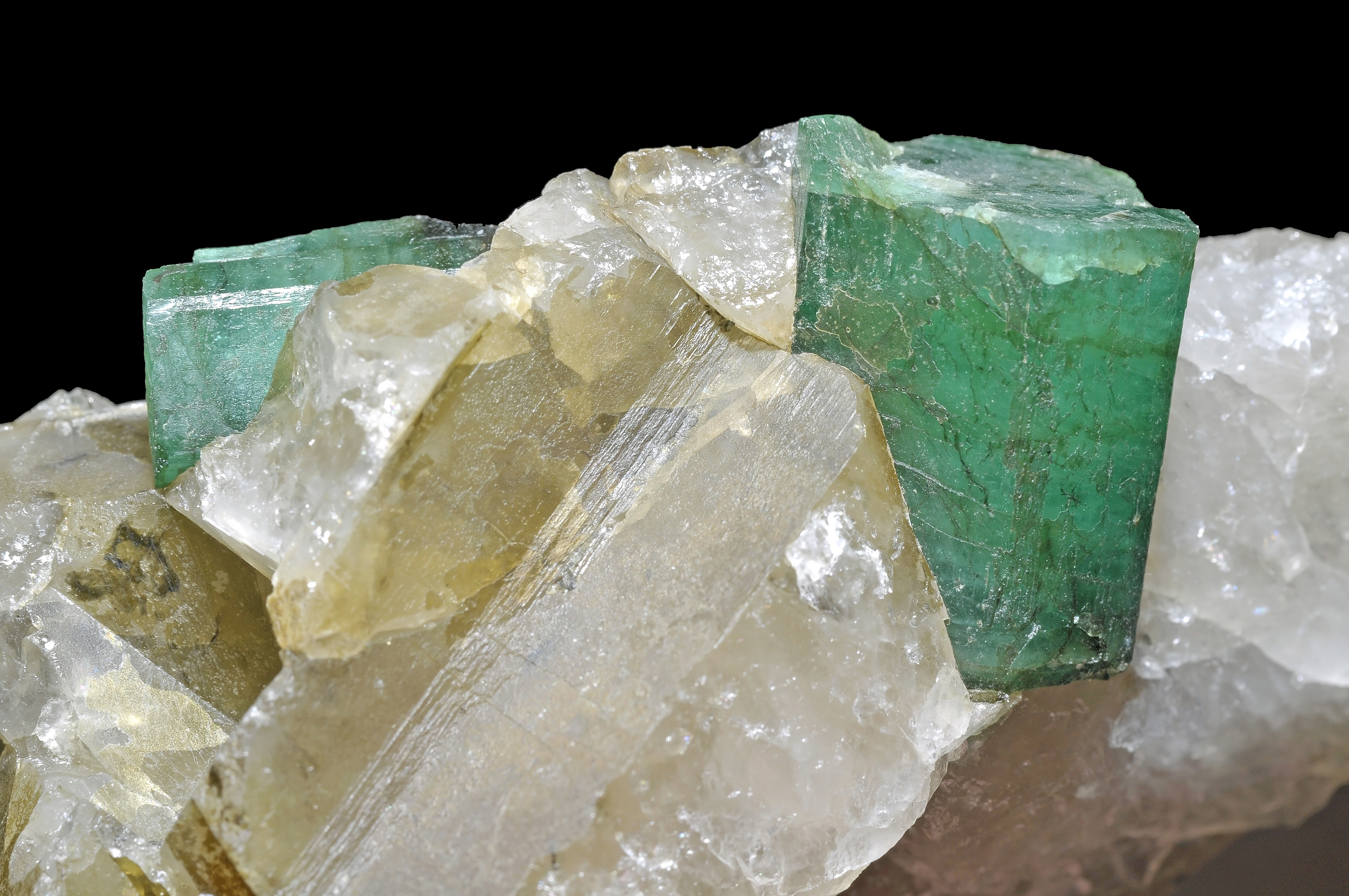
Emerald on quartz, from Carnaiba Mine, Pindobaçu, Campo Formoso ultramafic complex, Bahia, Brazil

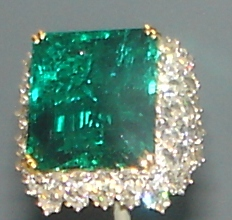
The Chalk Emerald ring, containing a top-quality 37-carat emerald, in the U.S. National Museum of Natural History

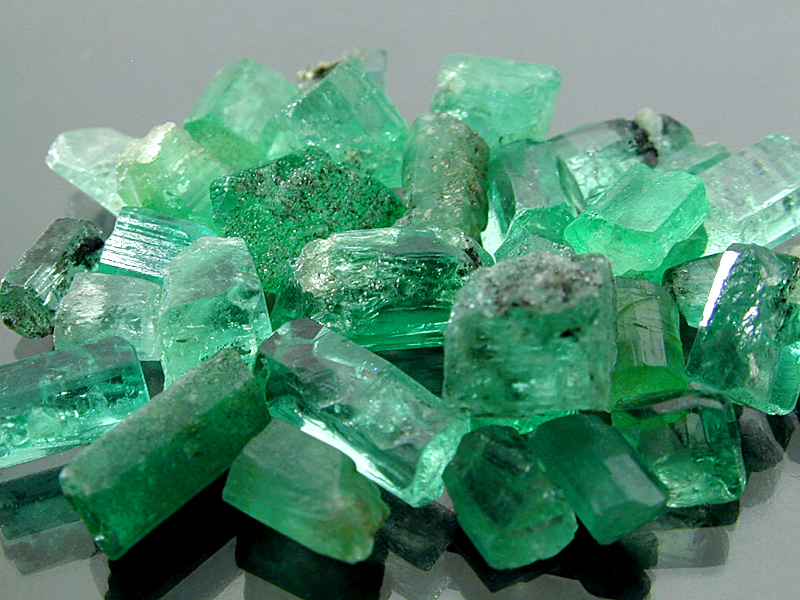
Emerald crystals

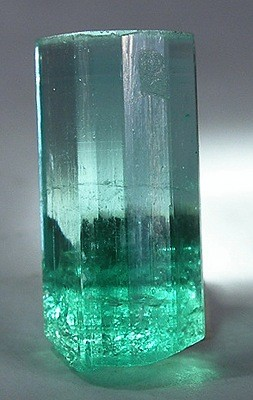
A 5-carat emerald from Muzo with hexagonal cross-section

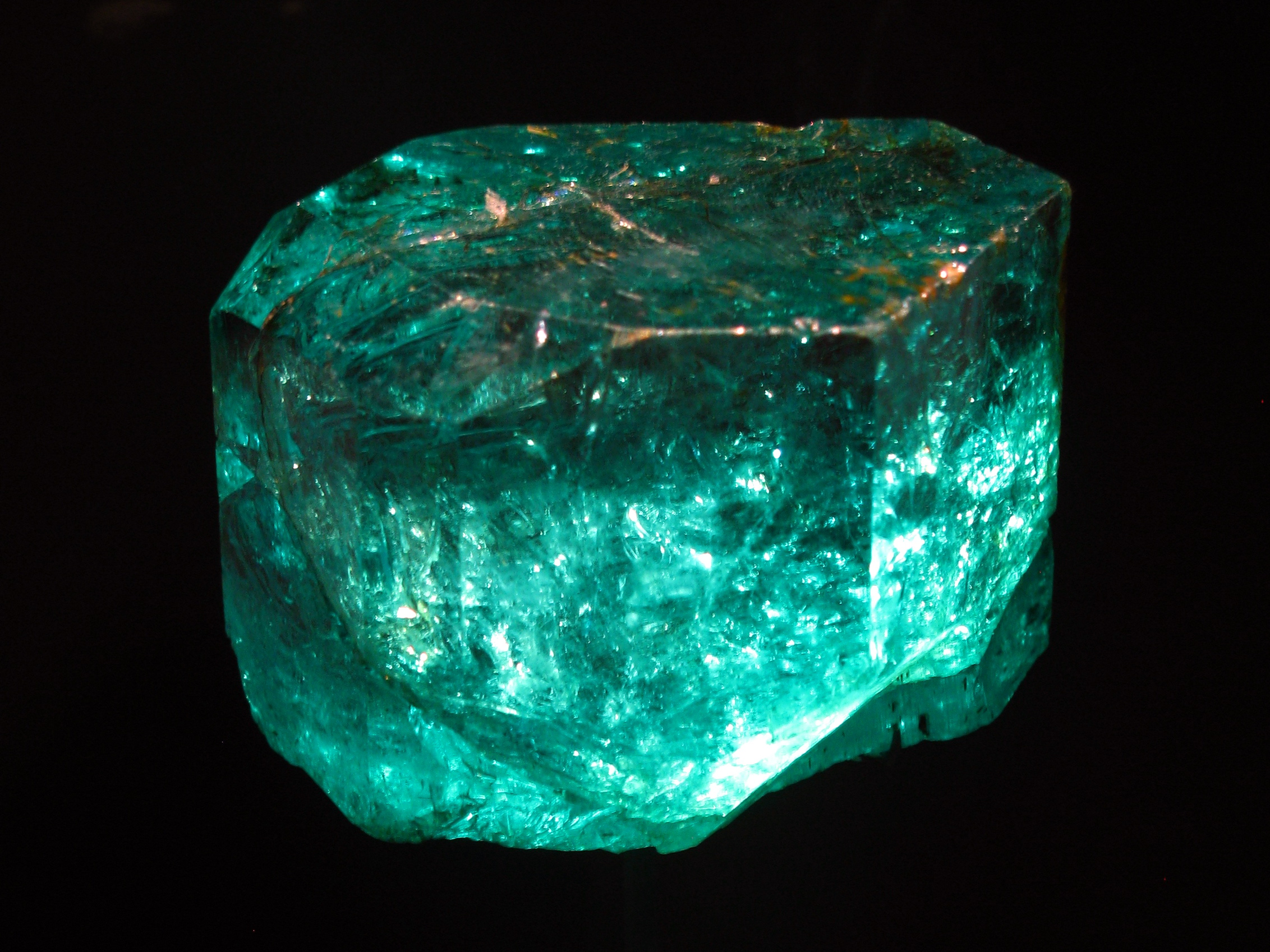
Gachalá Emerald, one of the largest gem emeralds in the world, at 858 carats (171.6 g). Found in 1967 at La Vega de San Juan mine in Gachalá, Colombia. Housed at the National Museum of Natural History in Washington, D.C.

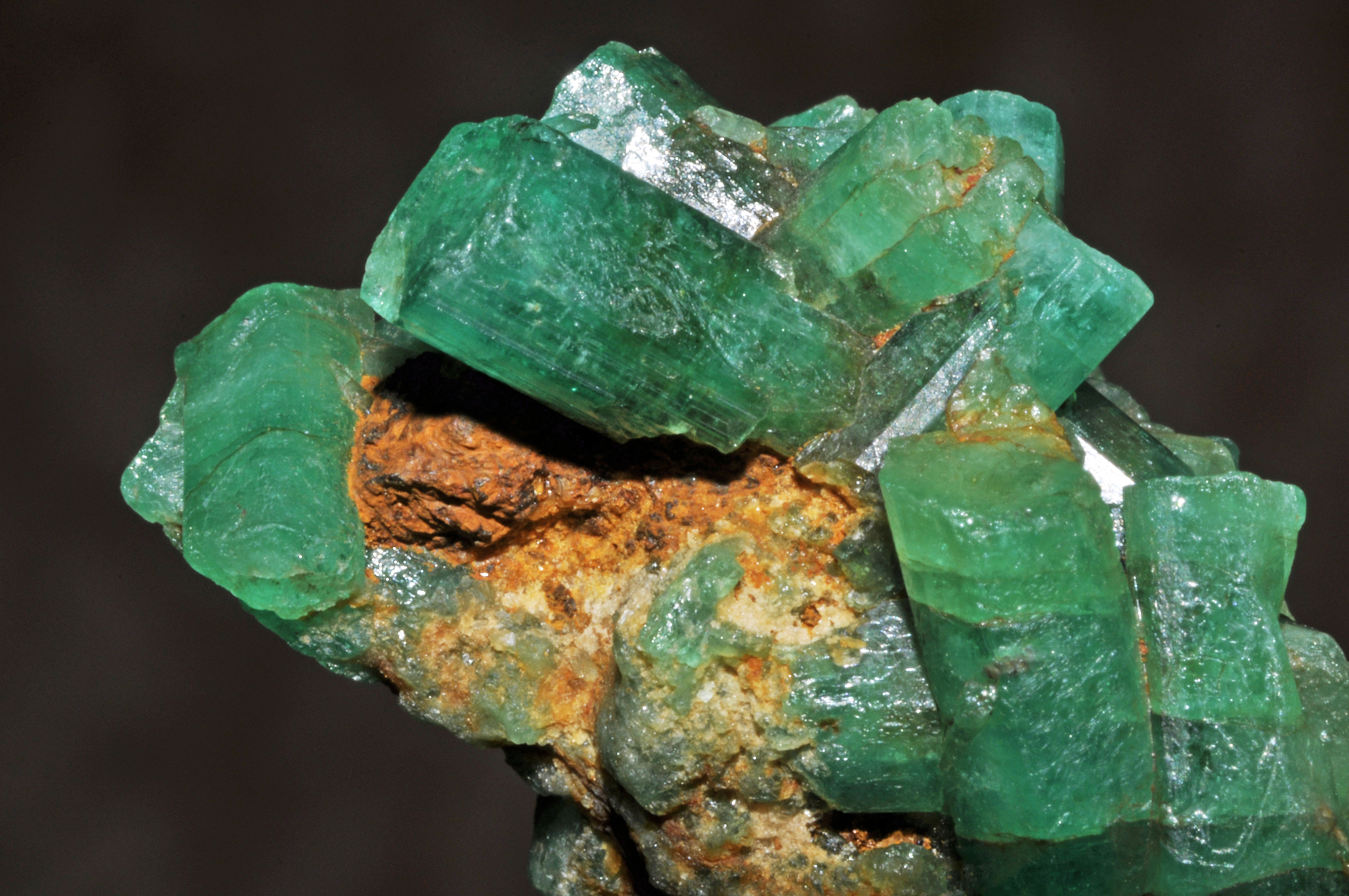
Colombian emeralds

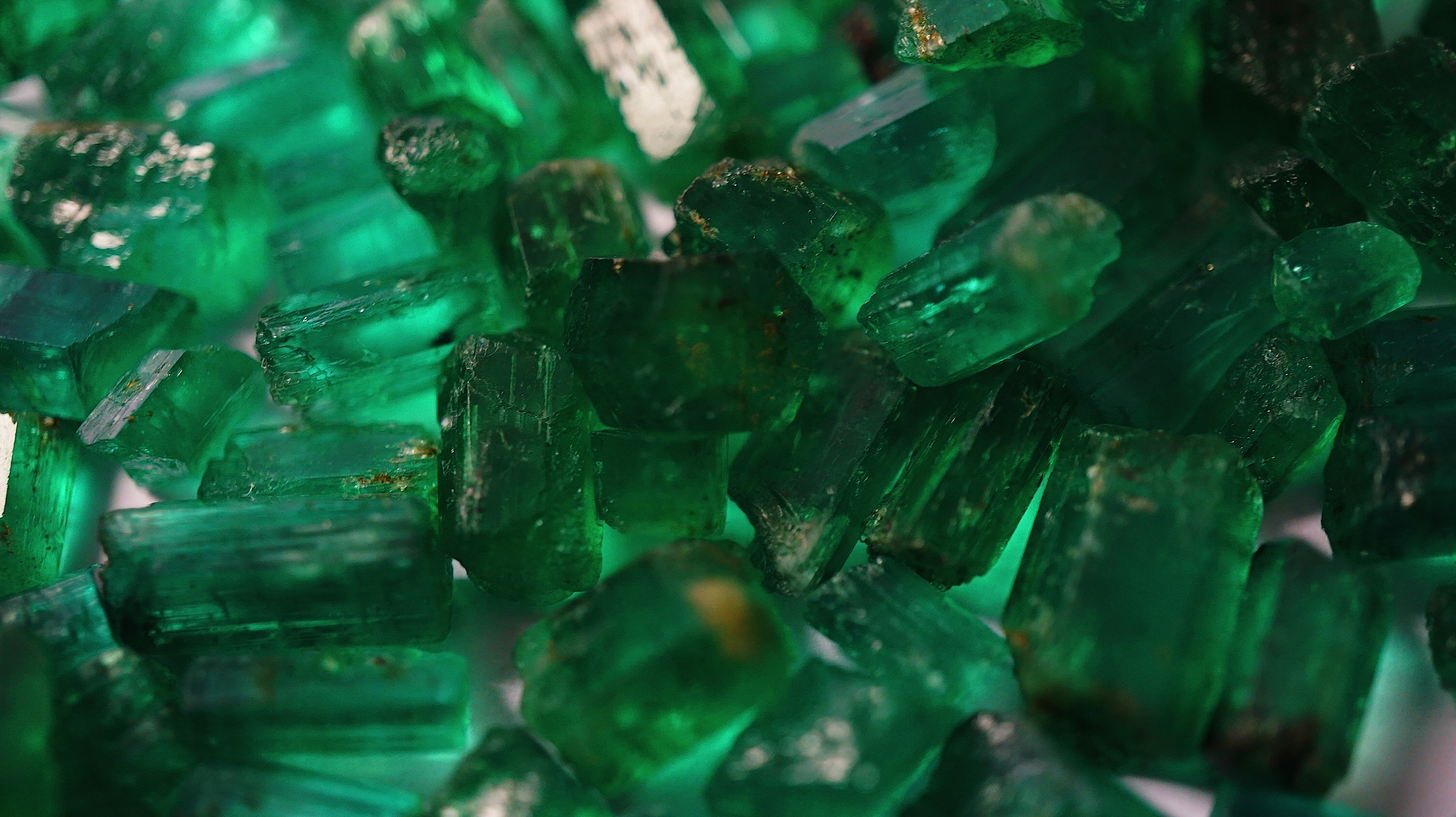
Rough emerald crystals from Panjshir Valley Afghanistan

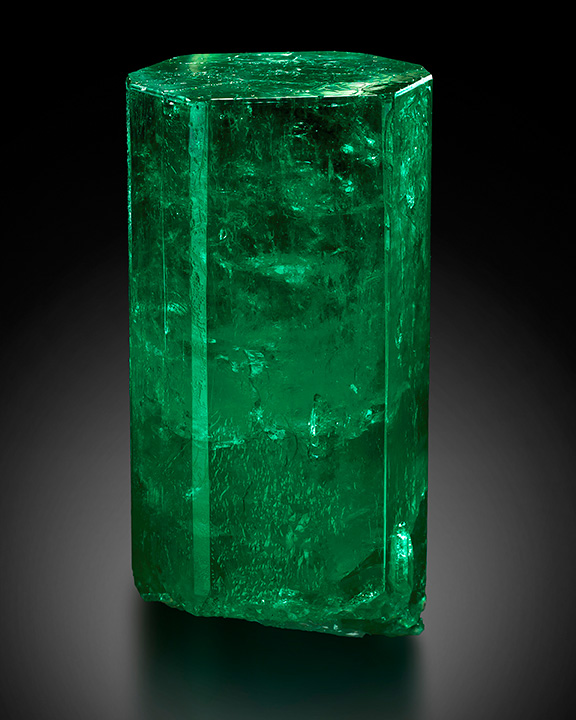
Large, di-hexagonal prismatic crystal of 1,390 carats uncut with a deep green color. It is transparent and features few inclusions in the upper 2/3, and is translucent in the lower part. Housed at the Mim Museum, Beirut, Lebanon.

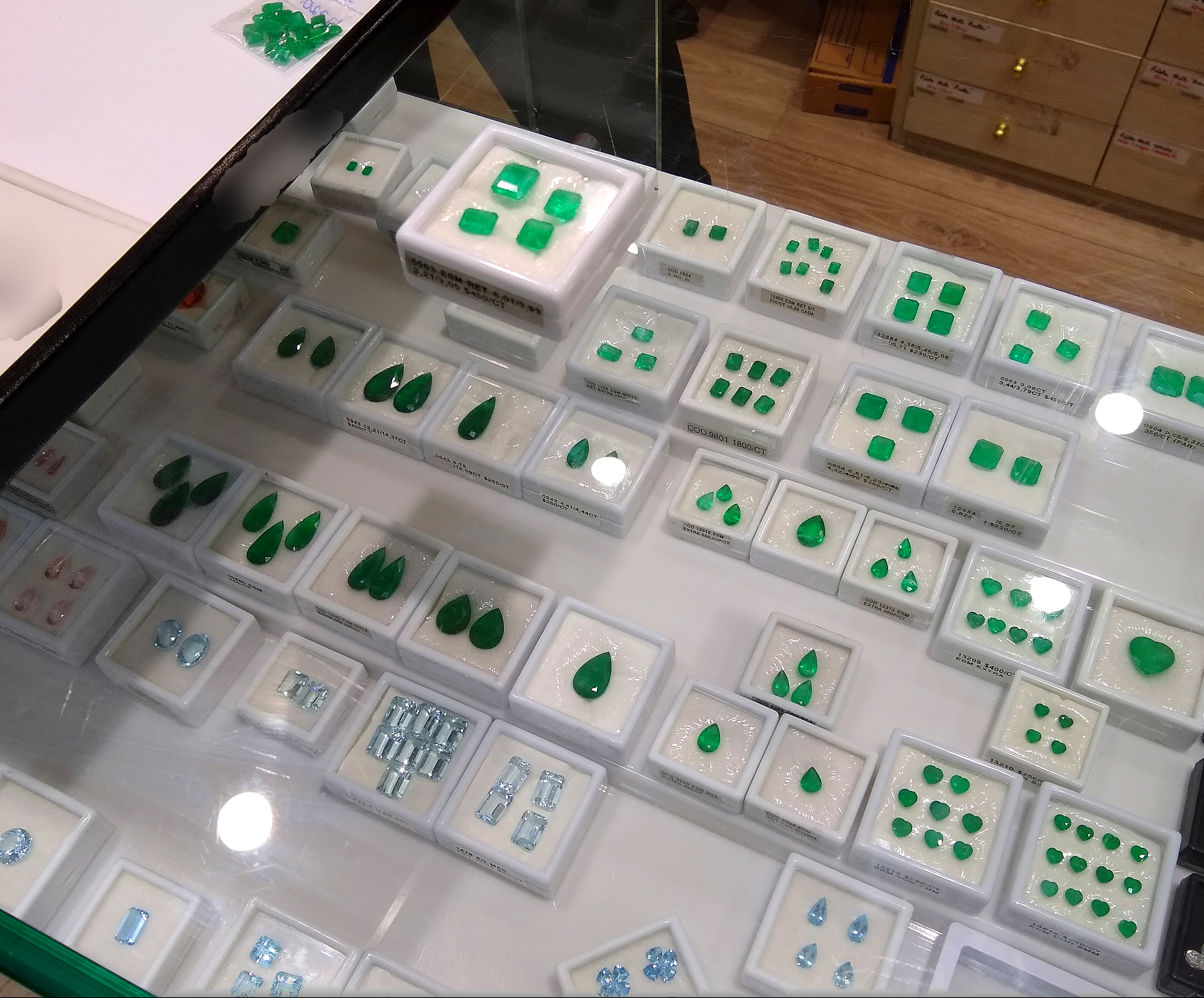
Cut Emeralds

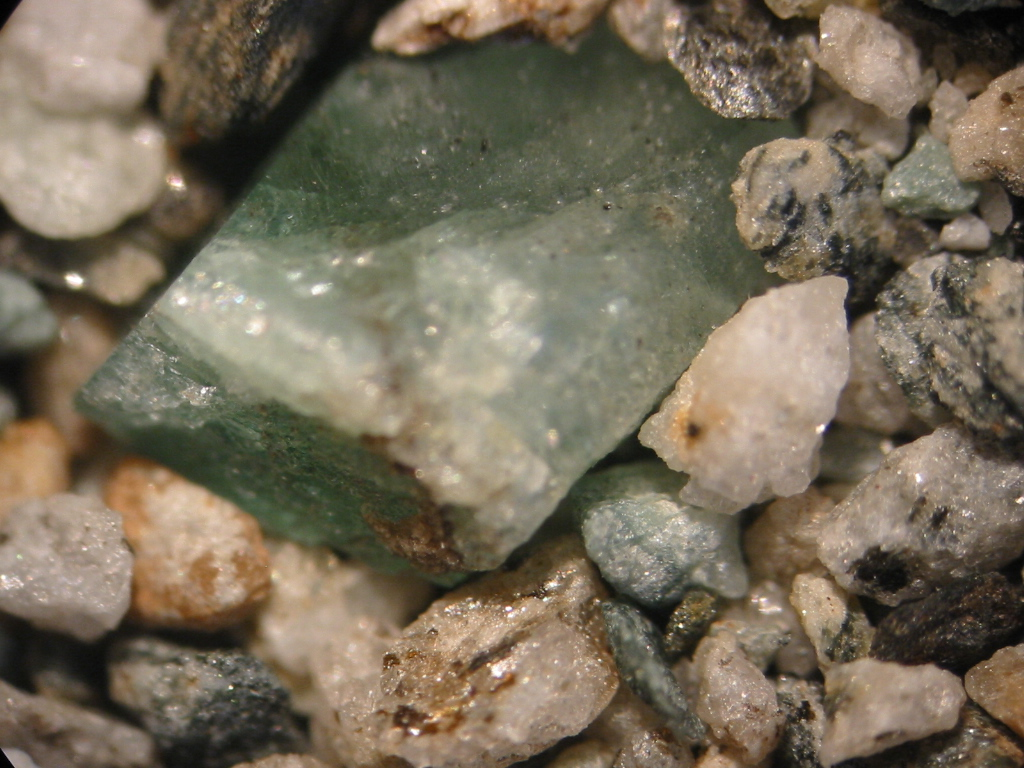
Habachtal emerald

== See also ==
- List of emeralds by size
- List of minerals
- Mineral industry of Colombia
- Colombian emeralds
- Cardinal gem
- Sapphire
- Ruby
- Red beryl
- Turquoise
