= Gachalá Emerald =

Large emerald originating in Colombia

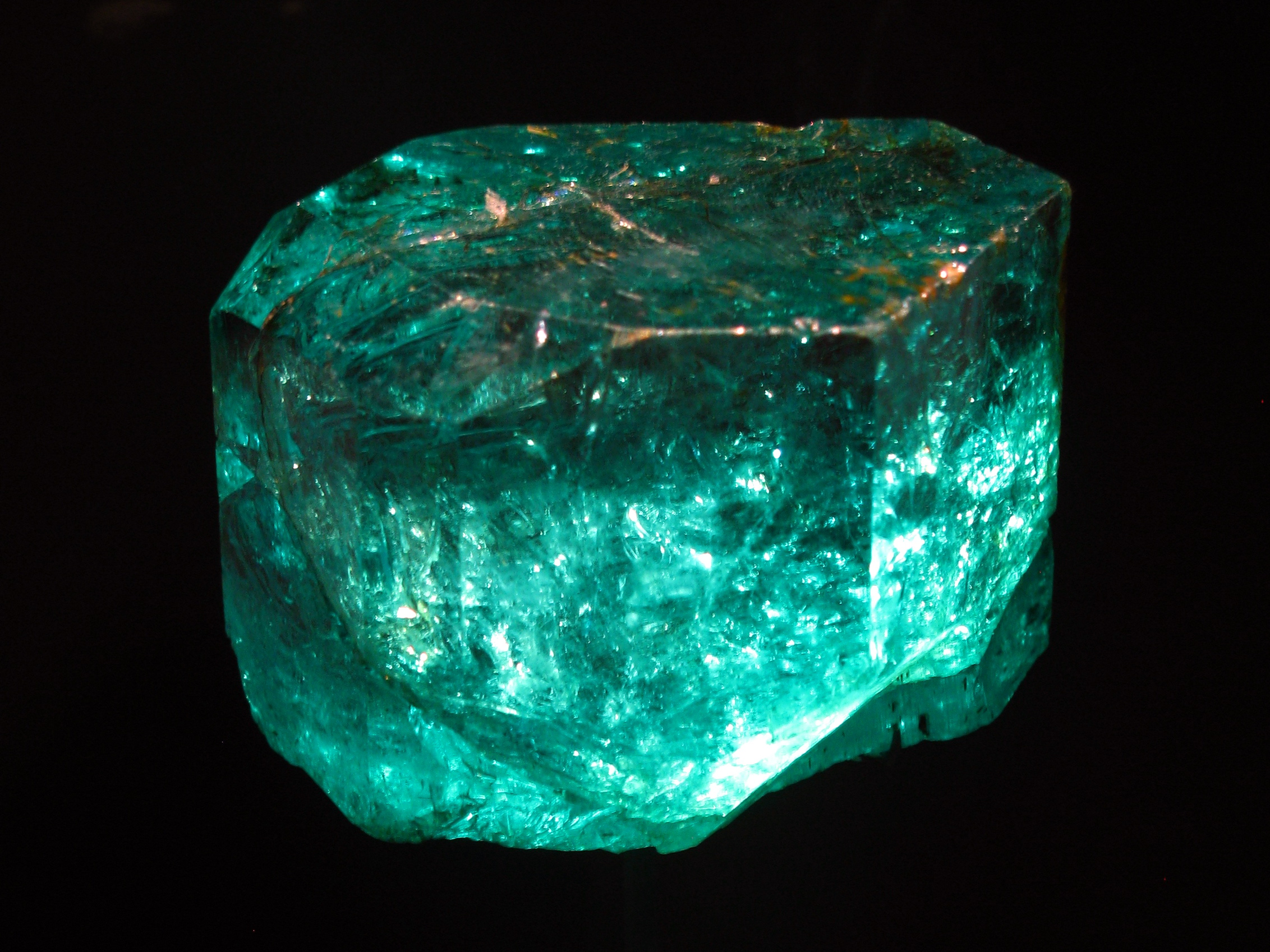
- The Gachala Emerald is one of the largest emeralds in the world
- Type of stone: Emerald
- Weight: 858 carats (171.6 g)
- Dimensions: 5 centimetres (2.0 in)
- Color: Emerald green
- Country of origin: Colombia
- Mine of origin: Gachalá, Cundinamarca
- Discovered: 1967
- Original owner: Harry Winston
- Owner: Smithsonian Institution

Gachalá municipality in the Cundinamarca Department, Colombia

The Gachalá Emerald is a large emerald originating from Colombia. It is one of the most valuable and famous emeralds in the world, found in 1967 in the mine Vega de San Juan, located in Gachalá, Colombia. Gachalá Chibcha means "place of Gacha." Presently the emerald is in the United States, where it was donated to the Smithsonian Institution by the New York City jeweler, Harry Winston.

== Symbolism ==
The emerald was named in honor of Gachalá, the municipality of Cundinamarca Department where it was found.

== Characteristics ==
- Shape: Emerald
- Color: Intense green
- Carats: 858 Carats
- Weight: 172 grams (6.1 oz)
- Size: 5 centimetres (2.0 in)
- Year of extraction: 1967

== Conservation ==
The emerald is part of the permanent collection of the Smithsonian Institution in Washington, D.C. It was donated in 1969 by the American jeweler Harry Winston, and is labeled under number 122078 in the catalog.

== See also ==
- Colombian emeralds
- Chivor
- List of individual gemstones
- List of emeralds by size
