= Trapiche (disambiguation) =

A trapiche is a type of mill used to extract juice.

Trapiche may also refer to:

- Trapiche (Canary Islands), a neighbourhood in the municipality of Arucas, Las Palmas on the island of Gran Canaria
- Trapiche, San Luis, a city in San Luis Province of Argentina
- Trapiche (winery), a winery in Mendoza, Argentina
- Trapiche, a neighborhood in Maceió, state of Alagoas, Brazil
- Trapiche, a star-shaped pattern of inclusions sometimes found in gemstones, including trapiche emerald, ruby, sapphire and tourmaline
