= National Capital Trolley Museum =

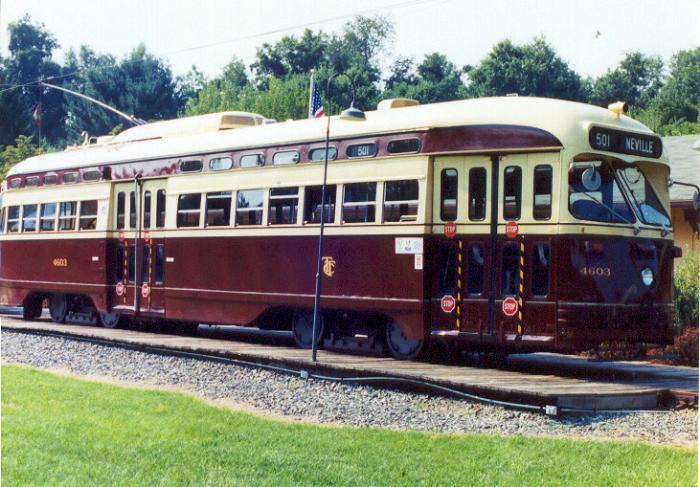
- Toronto PCC streetcar 4603 at the National Capital Trolley Museum's original location in 2002. The museum has since moved to a new facility, roughly in the same area.

- Location within Maryland National Capital Trolley Museum (the United States)
- Established: 1959
- Location: 1313 Bonifant Road, Colesville, Maryland
- Coordinates: 39.095833°N 77.031389°W
- Type: 501(c)(3) nonprofit museum
- Key holdings: Historic electric street railway vehicles
- President: Wes Cox
- Owners: National Capital Historical Museum of Transportation, Inc.
- Website: www.dctrolley.org

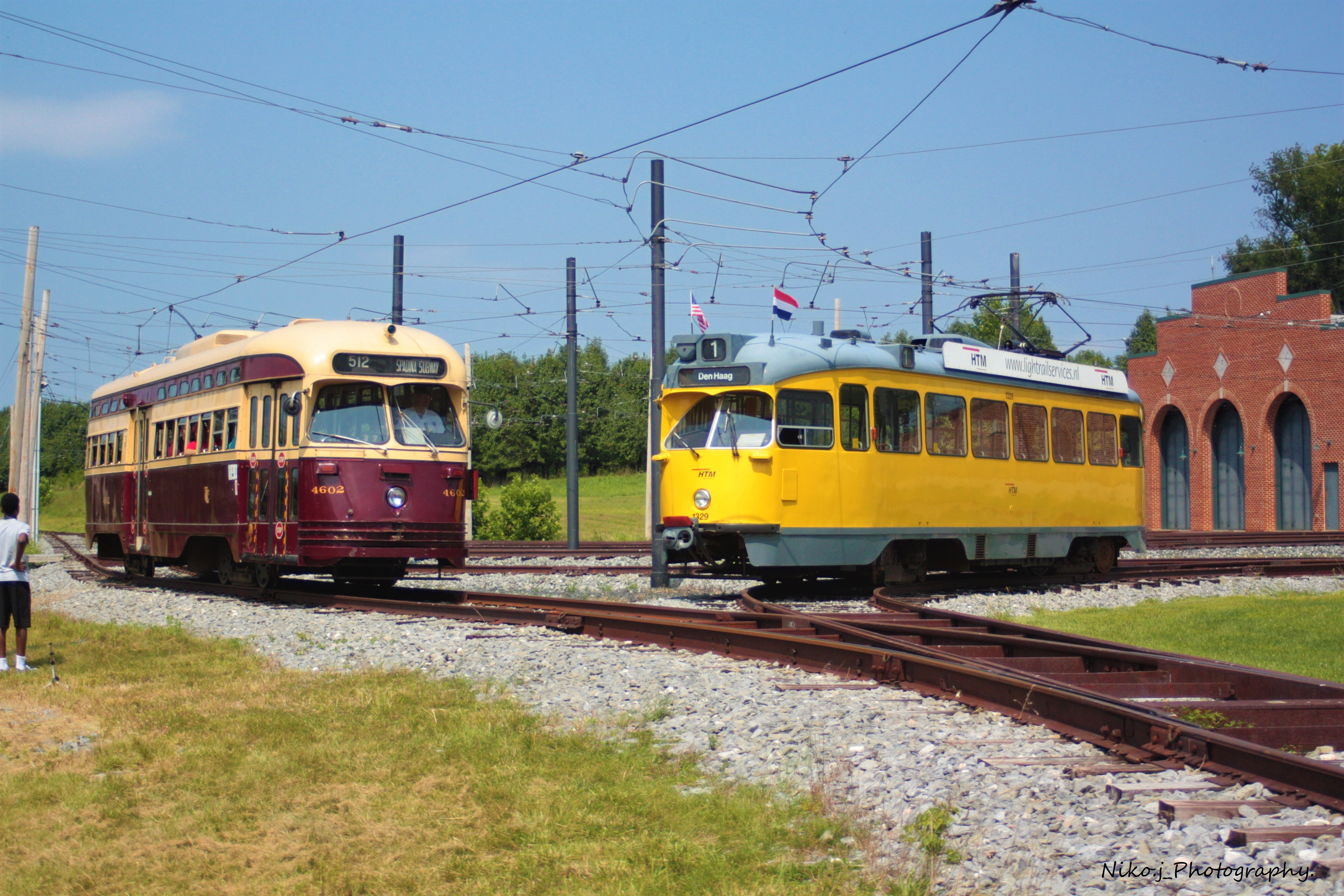
Toronto PCC streetcar 4602 and Haagsche Tramweg-Maatschappij (HTM) 1329 at the National Capital Trolley Museum.

The National Capital Trolley Museum (NCTM) is a 501(c)(3) nonprofit organization that operates historic street cars, trolleys and trams for the public on a regular schedule. Located in Montgomery County, Maryland, the museum's primary mission is to preserve and interpret the history of the electric street and interurban railways of the National Capital region.

== History ==
NCTM was incorporated on January 4, 1961, as the National Capital Historical Museum of Transportation, Inc. Progress was slow at first, but the museum eventually combined efforts and streetcar collections with a group from Baltimore.

The organization found its first home in Lake Roland Park in Baltimore, Maryland.

After efforts were thwarted by adjacent property owners, the group divided the collections in 1966. National Capital Trolley Museum moved to its present site in Colesville, Maryland, while the Baltimore Streetcar Museum was formed to focus on Baltimore transit.

The site was provided by Maryland-National Capital Park and Planning Commission, and DC Transit leased trolleys for a nominal cost. The organization raised $20,000 to build a car barn. Groundbreaking of the Colesville site began on November 20, 1965.

NCTM's original intention was to operate streetcars owned by DC Transit president O. Roy Chalk, but it was not until 1970 that Chalk donated several historic Washington streetcars. In the interim, the museum acquired a small fleet of European trams and a car from Johnstown, Pennsylvania.

NCTM ran its first streetcar in October 1969, and since then the museum has operated consistently over its one-mile line.

In the winter of 2008–2009, the museum moved into three new buildings: a Visitors Center, a display building for the streetcars (Street Car Hall), and a street car maintenance building. Construction of the Intercounty Connector, (ICC) which crosses the museum's former location, required the museum to shift locations in the Park. The museum reopened on Saturday, January 16, 2010.

== Education efforts ==
The museum offers a variety of education programs and activities throughout the year. On Thursdays and Fridays each spring and fall, the museum hosts school field trips by advance reservation. Special summer programs are offered on Thursday and Friday from June 15 to August 15 with age-appropriate activities.

== Membership and funding ==
Members and friends support the museum with dues, donations and volunteer service. The museum receives most of its money from admission fees and revenues from its gift shop. Other funding for a variety of projects is provided by the Arts and Humanities Council of Montgomery County, the Montgomery County Heritage Tourism Alliance, the Montgomery County Historic Preservation Commission, and the Maryland Historical Trust. The State of Maryland, Montgomery County, and private donors provided capital funding support for the current relocation.

== Collection ==
At one point or another, NCTM has owned an example of nearly every type of Washington, D.C. street car to be preserved. These include:

- DC Transit 0522 and 0509*, pre-1900 wooden street cars
- Washington Railway and Electric Company 650, a 1912 center door car
- Capital Transit 766, a 1918 deck-roof standard car (under restoration as Capital Traction Company 27)
- Capital Transit 1053*, the only complete preserved pre-PCC streamliner
- DC Transit 1101, Washington's first PCC street car
- Capital Transit 07*, 09, and 026*, wooden snow sweepers
- Capital Transit 1430, a PCC car built during World War II
- Capital Transit 1470, a PCC car built in 1945 (acquired in July 2020 from the Virginia Museum of Transportation)
- Capital Transit 1540, a PCC car built in 1945
- Hague Tramway 1006, PCC car built in 1952

The asterisk (*) indicates cars lost in the 2003 carbarn fire.

NCTM holds the largest collection of surviving Washington, D.C. street cars in the world, in addition to an archive of Washington, D.C. street car and Maryland interurban railroad records, journals, and miscellaneous artifacts.

The NCTM collection has also included streetcars from Berlin, Düsseldorf, Graz, The Hague, Toronto, Vienna, New York City, Philadelphia, Johnstown, Pennsylvania, Brussels and Blackpool.

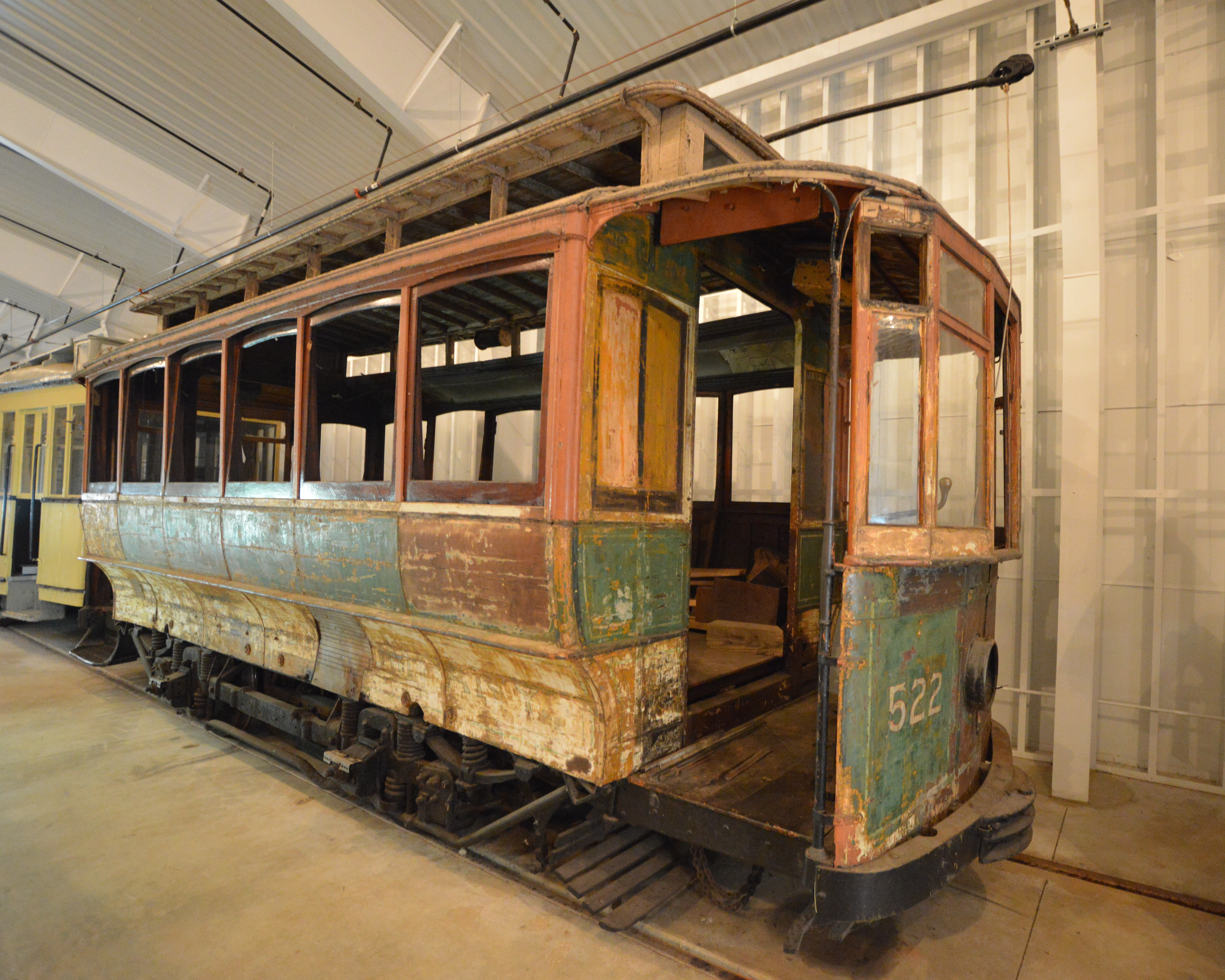
Capital Traction Company #522

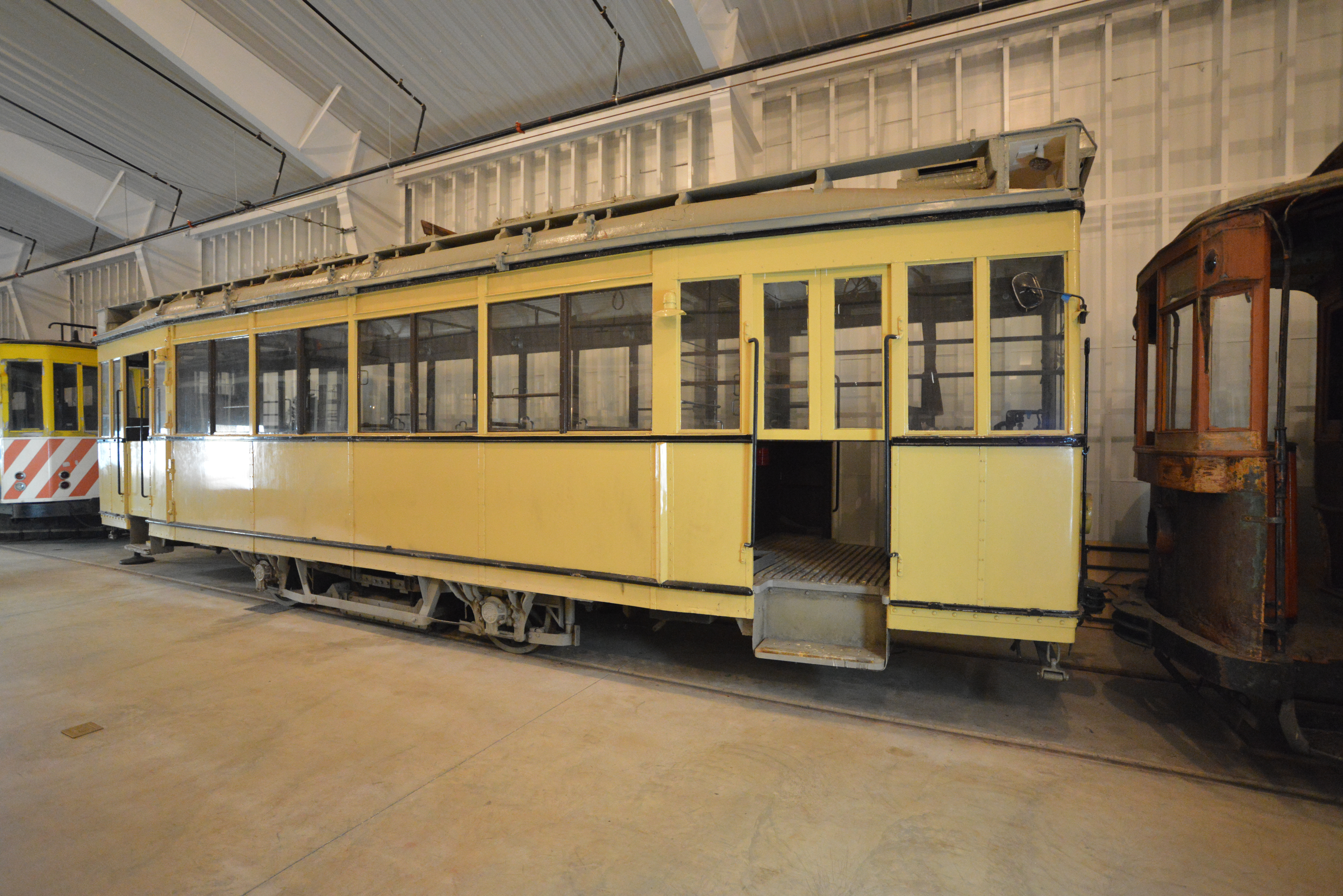
Berliner Verkehrsbetriebe #5954

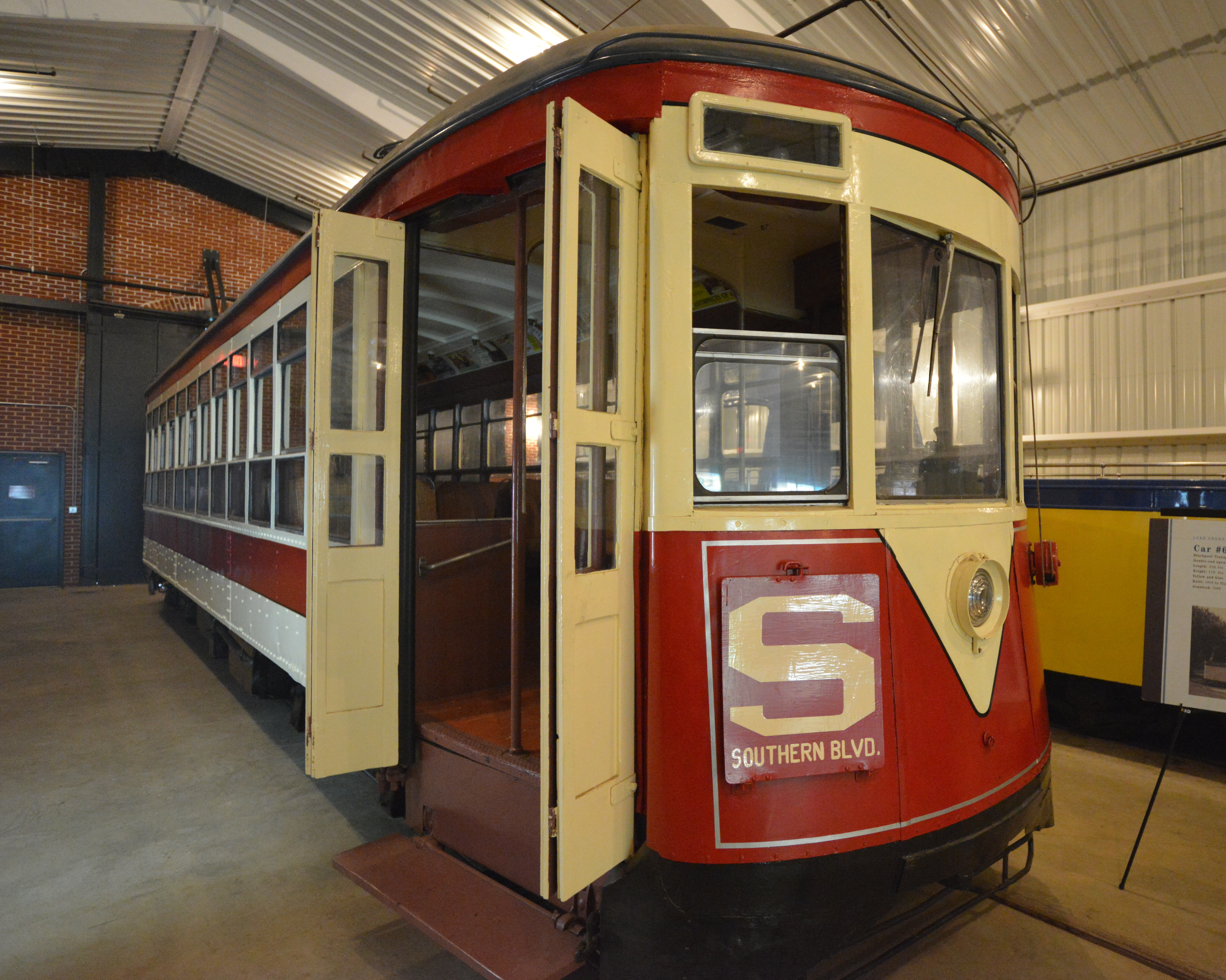
Third Avenue Railway System #678

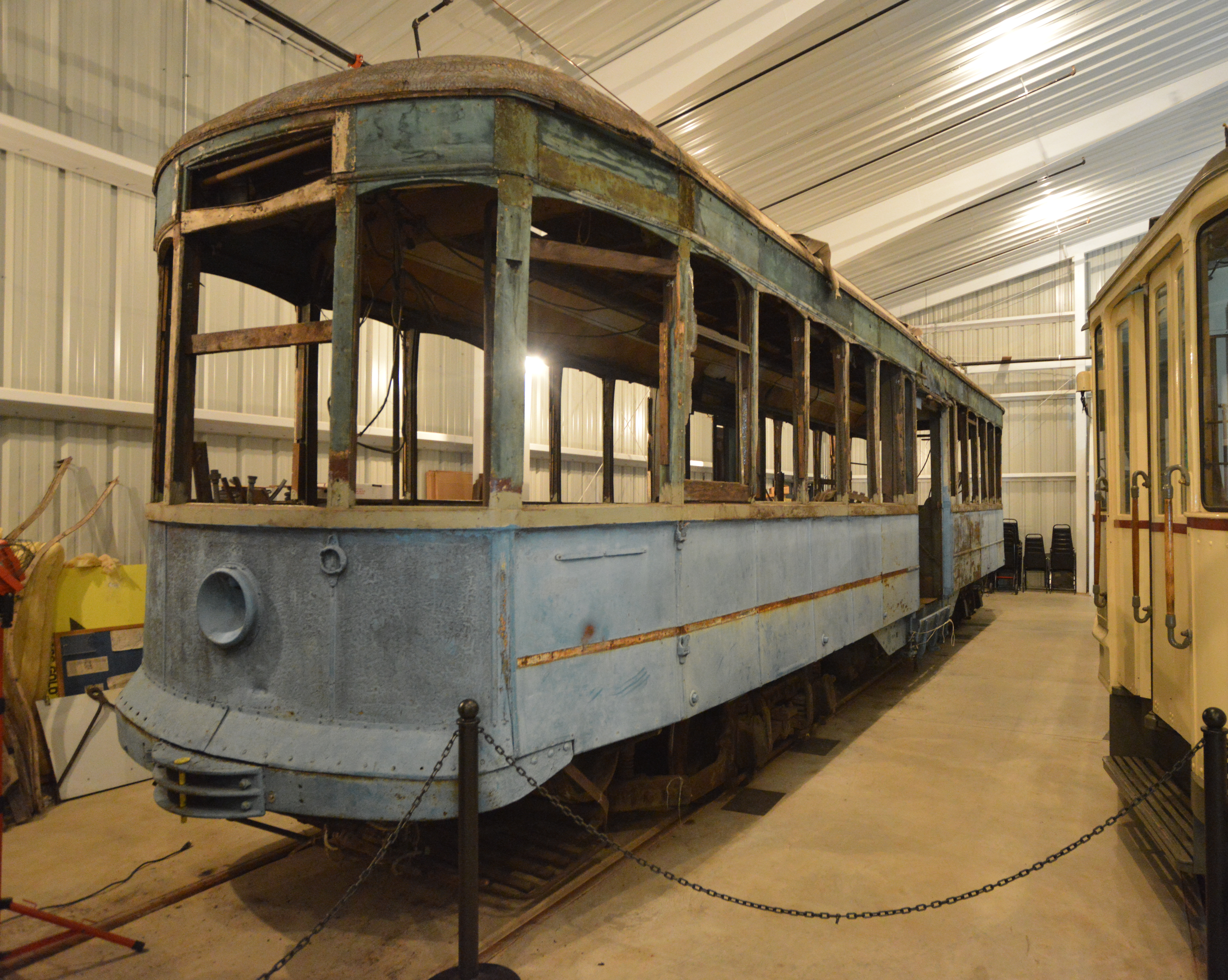
Washington Railway and Electric Company #650

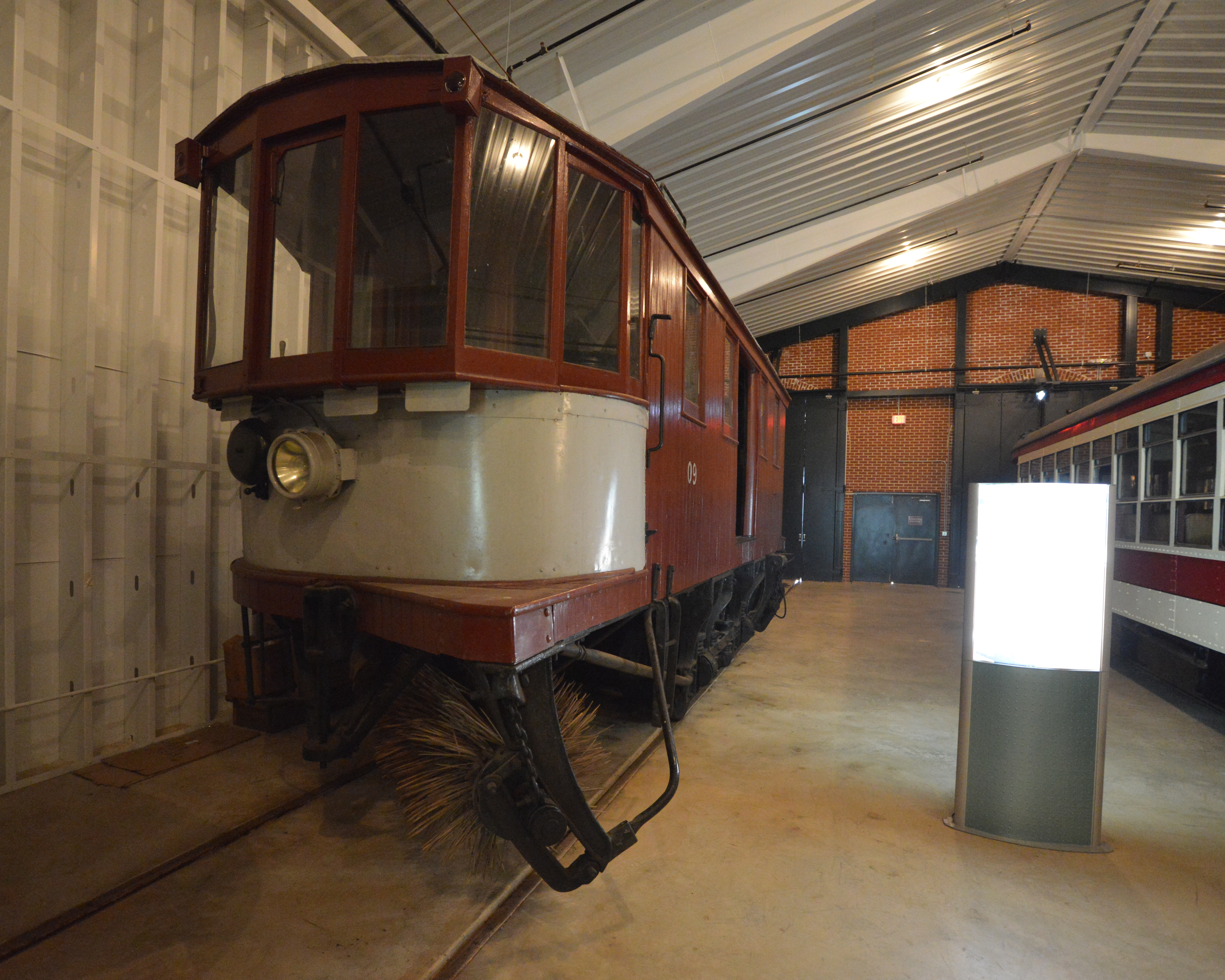
Capital Transit Company No. 09

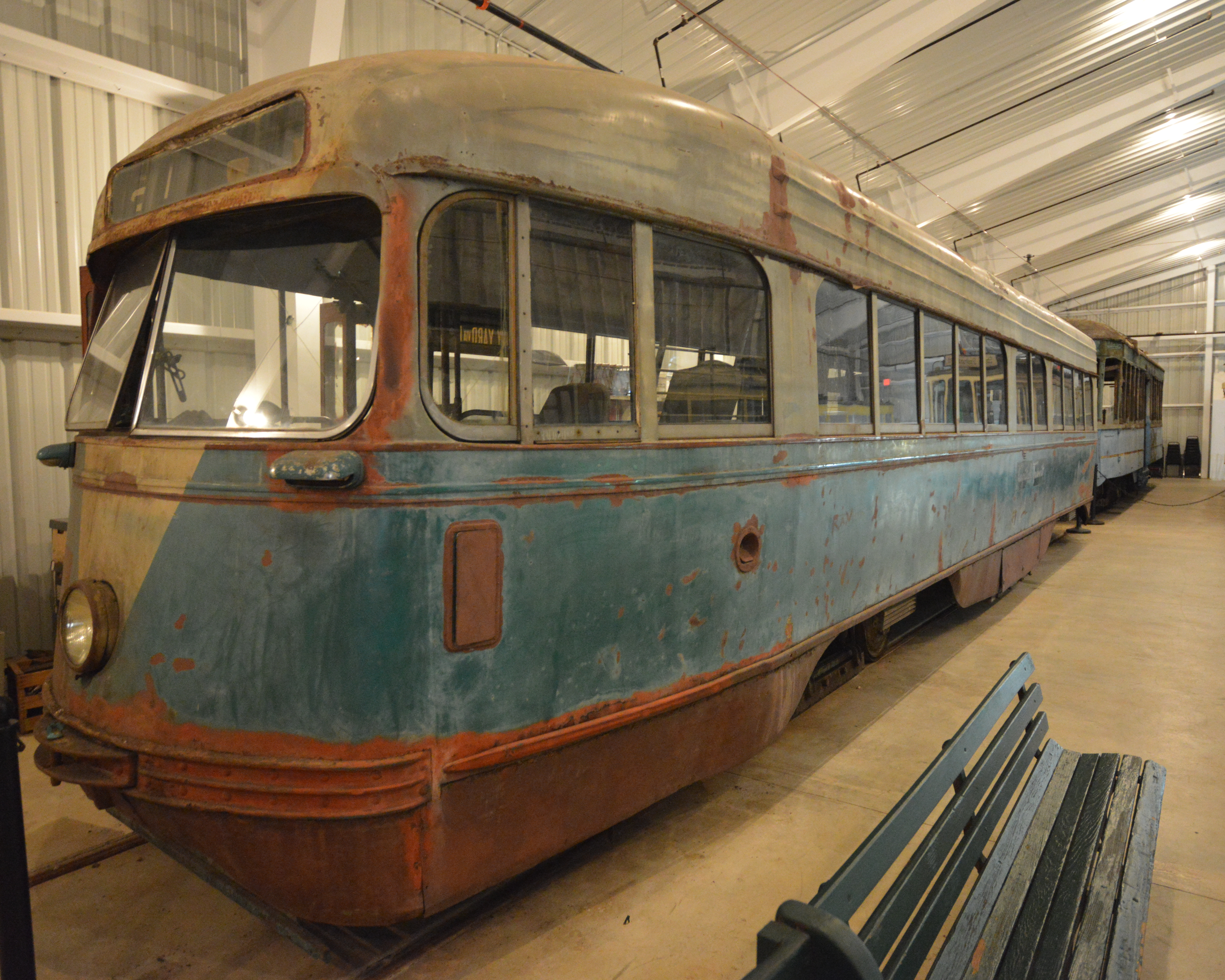
Capital Transit #1430

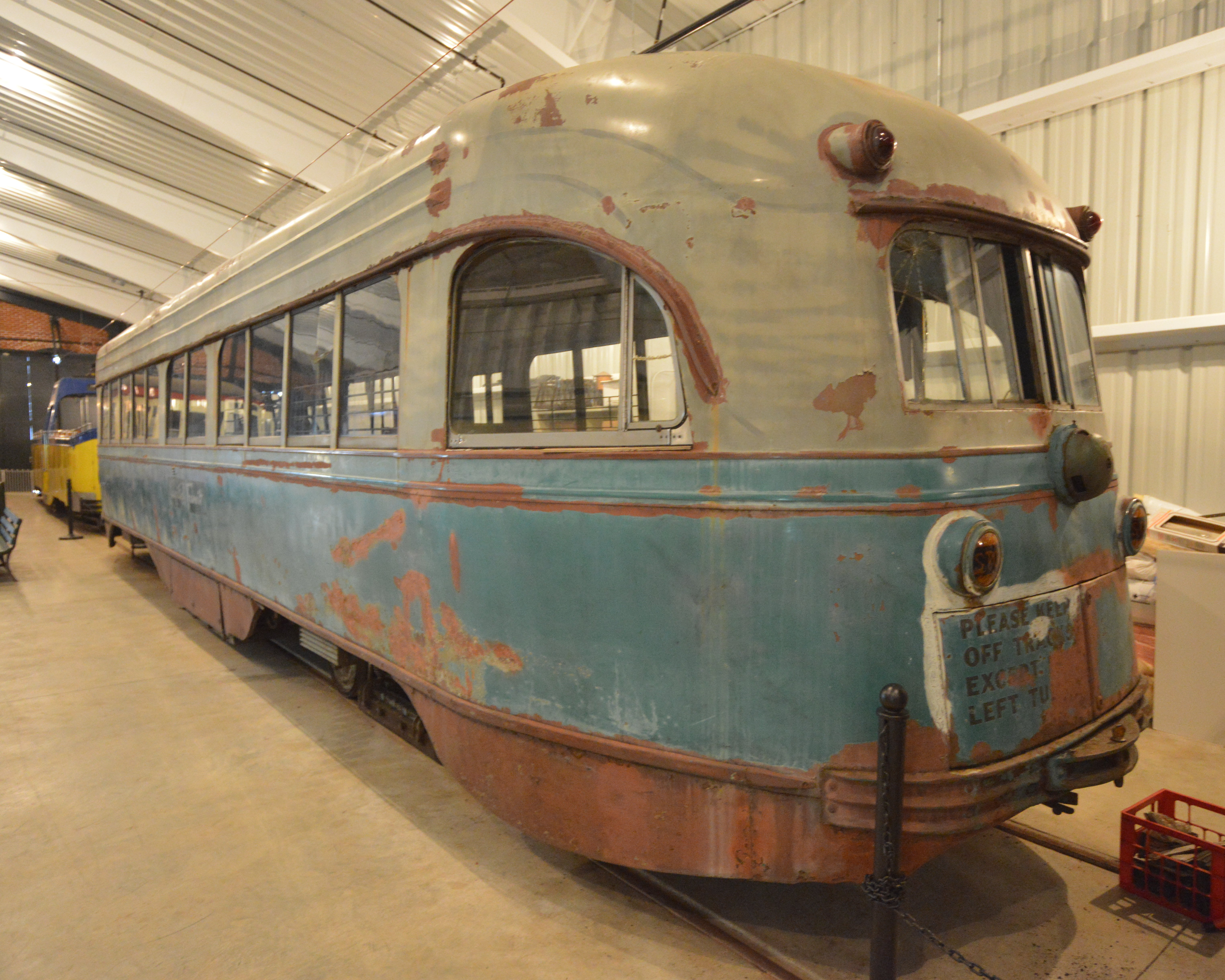
Capital Transit #1430

== Exhibits ==
Toronto Transit Commission PCC streetcar 4603 pulls into the Visitor Center.

=== Demonstration Railway ===
National Capital Trolley Museum

Technical
- Track gauge: 4 ft 8 1/2 in (1,435 mm) standard gauge
- Electrification: 600 Volts DC

During public hours, street cars leave the museum from the Dispatcher's Desk in the center of the Visitor Center. The Demonstration Railway is the largest and most popular exhibit of the museum. The one mile (1.6 km) line goes past Street Car Hall and the Maintenance Barn and down into the woods past Dodge siding, along Northwest Branch, and on to Fish Hook loop to turn around for the return trip.

=== Street Cars Go to the Movies ===
Harold Lloyd’s silent films are excerpted and displayed continuously in a small theater. Exhibits on the walls leading into the theater link the importance of movies and street cars to community life in the early part of the 20th century.

=== Street Car Communities & Rock Creek Railway Co. ===
This exhibit highlights street car transportation in the local communities and includes a working model of the street car line through Chevy Chase, one of the first street car suburbs in the country. This exhibit includes images of the power house at the end of the line, a worker emerging from a plow pit where each street car traveling between downtown and the suburbs is converted from collecting underground power with a plow to an overhead trolley pole. Visitors can use the controller handle to start the street car and can operate a dynamo to generate electricity for the lights in the buildings along the track.

=== Conduit Hall ===
An actual piece of track and the steel framework for the underground electrical conduit is on display in Conduit Hall along with a model of a conduit switch. Conduit Hall also includes overhead "trolleys" (the electricity collecting device that makes contact with the overhead wire) and a hands-on controller from the early 20th century.

=== Street Car Hall ===
Adjacent to Conduit Hall and the Visitor Center is Street Car Hall. At any one time seven or more street cars are on display in this spacious building. Near the cars are illuminated kiosks with information about the street cars in the collection and their history. The display includes the oldest street car in the collection, DC Transit 0522 built in 1898. At the end of each street car trip, a docent will take passengers into Street Car Hall and discuss the history of street car development and answer questions.

== Accidents and fires ==
In 1970, its unique air-conditioned PCC car 1512, the "Silver Sightseer," was damaged by arsonists and scrapped. In 1987, cars 1053 and 766 were severely damaged in a collision. One of the worst disasters to ever befall a North American trolley museum occurred at NCTM on September 28, 2003, when one of the two carbarns at the museum's former site burned down. Eight pieces of equipment, comprising about half of the museum's operating fleet and one-third of its total collection of street cars, were destroyed. Washington cars lost included 0509, 1053, 07, and 026. Johnstown 352, Graz 120, and Vienna 6062 and 7802 were also destroyed. The cause of the fire was not definitely determined, though the fire inspector did conclude that it was an accidental fire and not a case of arson. Some of the cars lost, such as 1053 and 07, were the only preserved examples of their designs, while others have examples preserved elsewhere. Immediately following the fire, the museum resumed operations with the remaining cars. Since the fire, the museum has purchased streetcars from, or traded with, other museums to replace those lost.
