= Chalk Emerald =

Large Colombian emerald

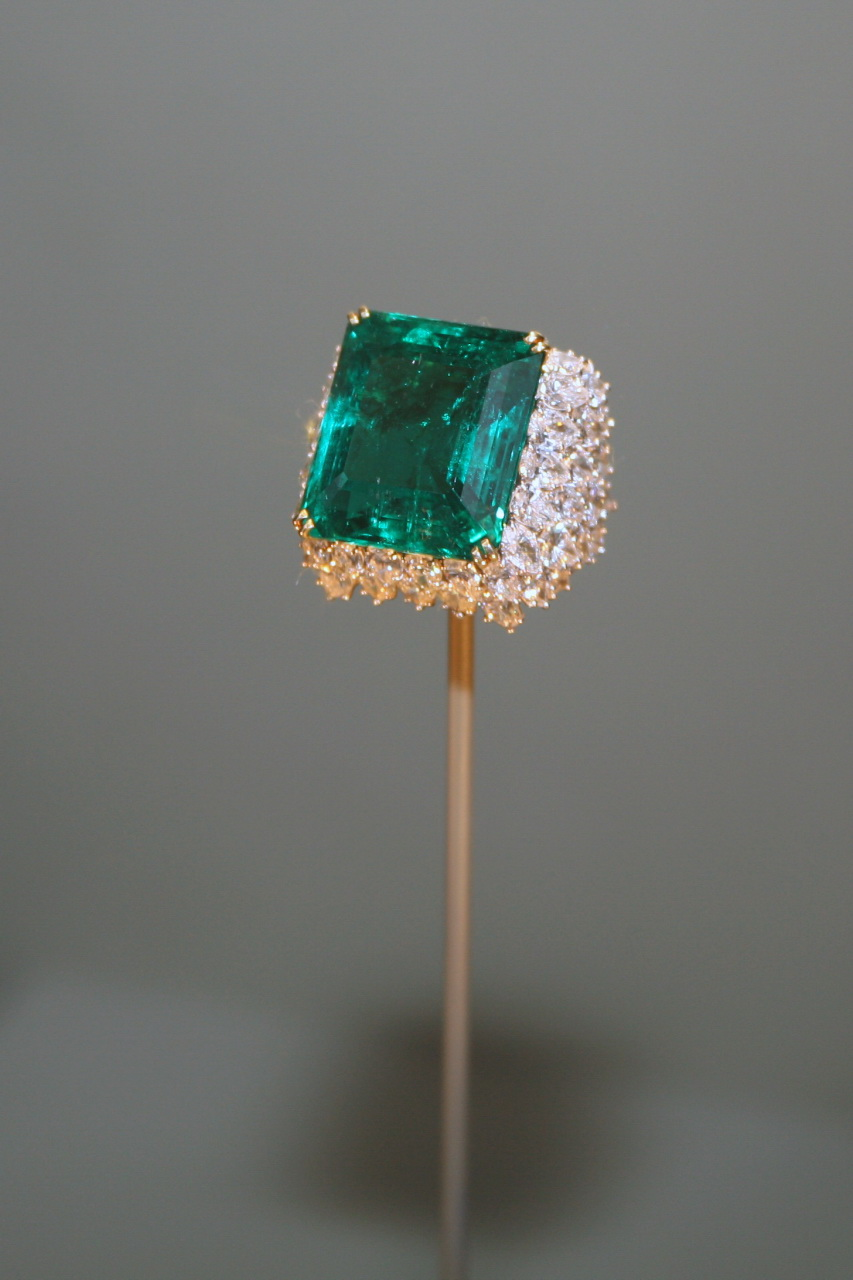
The Chalk Emerald ring

The Chalk Emerald is a 37.82 carats (7.564 g) rectangular step-cut emerald, mined in Muzo, Colombia. It was one of many Colombian emeralds shipped to India by the Spanish in the 16th and 17th centuries. Ownership of the stone after its arrival is unrecorded until its sale by Jagaddipendra Narayan, the Maharaja of Koch Bihar, to a British gem broker in 1959. Jagaddipendra stated that the stone was formerly the centerpiece of an emerald and diamond necklace worn by his mother, Indira Devi, to various state functions.

The emerald was purchased by the American jeweler Harry Winston, who recut it from its original weight of 38.40 carats (7.680 g), and added a gold setting to attach it to a platinum ring of his own design. Surrounding the Chalk Emerald itself are sixty pear-shaped diamonds, totalling 15.62 carats (3.124 g). The ring was sold in 1962 to Oscar Roy Chalk—an entrepreneur from New York for whom the emerald is now named—for his wife Clair to wear to a state dinner at the White House in honor of Queen Elizabeth II. Supposedly, she turned the ring around during the event so as to not upstage the less-impressive emerald ring worn by the Queen.

The Chalks donated the ring to the Smithsonian Institution in 1972, and it is now part of the Smithsonian's National Gem and Mineral Collection on display in the National Museum of Natural History in Washington, D.C.
