= Trapiche emerald =

Variety of the gemstone emerald

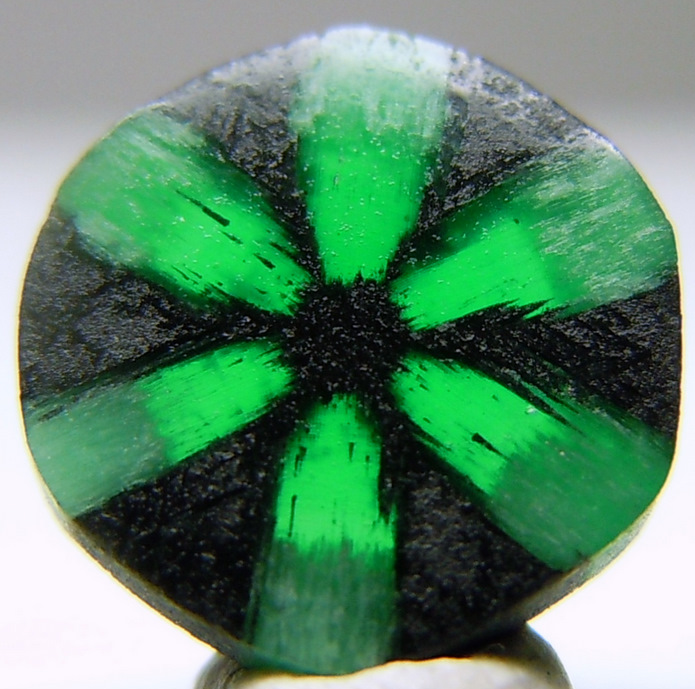
A trapiche emerald

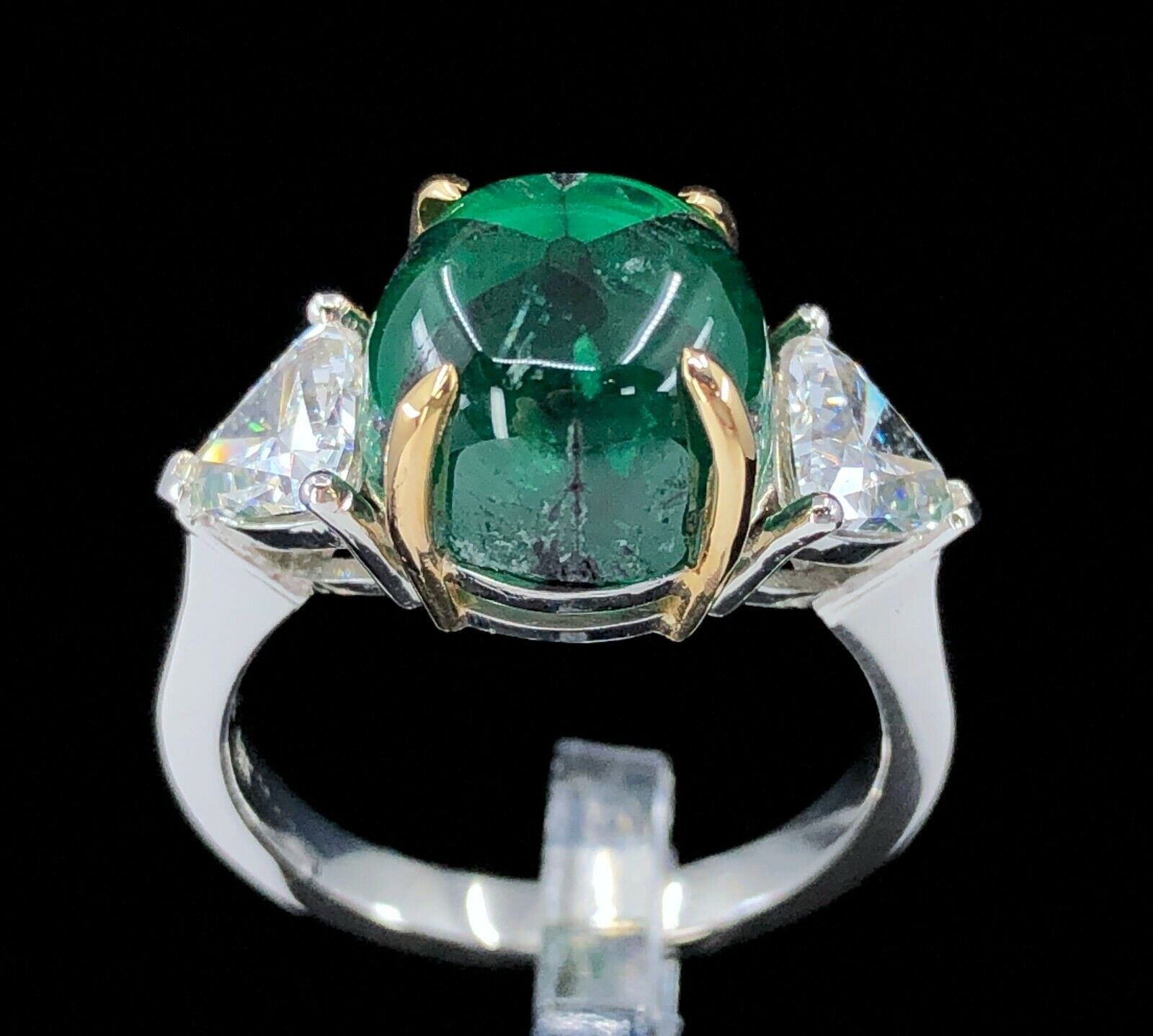
A Colombian trapiche emerald, diamond, platinum and 18K yellow gold ring

Trapiche emerald is a rare variety of the gemstone emerald, characterized by a six-arm radial pattern of usually black spokes separating areas of green emerald. If weathered, the black spokes may become light in color. Trapiche emerald is one of an assortment of trapiche or trapiche-type minerals. Others include trapiche ruby, sapphire, tourmaline, quartz, and chiastolite. The name comes from the Spanish term trapiche, a sugar mill, because of the resemblance of the pattern to the spokes of a grinding wheel. Emerald is a gem variety of the mineral beryl, and owes its distinctive green color to the presence of chromium and/or vanadium.

Trapiche emeralds were first described by Émile Bertrand in 1879. With few exceptions, they are found in the western part of the Eastern Cordillera basin, in the Muzo, Coscuez, and Peñas Blancas mines of Colombia, where they are rare. Although reported in older literature from Chivor, Colombia, that mining district is now thought to be an unlikely source. Extremely rare finds in Brazil and Madagascar have been reported.

The radial pattern in any individual trapiche emerald crystal exhibits a moderate amount of variance, depending in part on the distance from the termination of the crystal, and on where the cross-sectional slice of the crystal is taken. Some slices through trapiche emeralds have a hexagonal structure at the core.

There is not yet consensus about the mechanism by which the radial pattern forms, or the conditions required for it. Multiple models have been proposed. According to one interpretation the black radial arms are developed from clay minerals in the matrix where the emeralds formed. The clay matrix would later lithify to form shale. During growth of a "Type A" trapiche emerald, the clay minerals formed radial dendrites on which layers of emerald would grow. A "Type B" trapiche emerald exhibits the reverse growth pattern.

A trapiche pattern is a fixed-star pattern in a mineral, and differs from an asterism, which is a moving-star pattern in a mineral. Asterism is the result of tiny mineral inclusions, minute tubes, or nanovoids, oriented with the crystallographic directions of the mineral. In the case of corundum (ruby and sapphire), when light strikes the inclusions or nanovoids, it is both reflected and refracted, producing a multidirectional chatoyance.

== See also ==
- Trapiche (disambiguation)
