= Laster (surname) =

Origin
- Language: English
- Meaning: maker of cobblers’ lasts, shoemaker, cobbler
- Region of origin: United States

Other names
- Variant form: Last
- See also: Leist, Shoemaker, Schumaker, Schumacher, Chaucer, Zapatero, Calzolari, Cordonnier

Laster is an English language occupational surname for a shoemaker and may refer to:

- Andy Laster (born 1961), American jazz saxophonist
- Brayton Laster (born 2002), American racing driver
- Charlie Laster (born 1954), American politician
- Donald Laster (born 1958), former American football player
- Georgia Ann Laster (1927–1961), American singer
- J. Travis Laster, American lawyer and judge

== See also ==
- Lasker (surname)
- Last (surname)
- Lester
- Lister (surname)
- Luster (surname)
- Lauter (surname)
- Laster (disambiguation)
