= Metin Lütfi Baydar =

Turkish politician

Metin Lutfi Baydar MP

Member of the Grand National Assembly
- Incumbent
- Assumed office 12 June 2011
- Constituency: Aydın (2011, June 2015, Nov 2015)

Personal details
- Born: March 2, 1960 (age 66) İzmir, Turkey
- Education: Dokuz Eylül University; Gülhane Military Medical Academy; Süleyman Demirel University
- Occupation: Sports medicine Orthopedics; Traumatology

Metin Lütfi Baydar (born March 2, 1960) is a Turkish medical scientist. Currently, he is the president of Süleyman Demirel University. He is also chairman and surgeon general of SDU Research Hospital.

== Work in Medical Science ==
Baydar's field of research includes Orthopedics, Sport Medicine and Traumatology. Together with his collaborators, he published research studies specifically in knee surgery and mouthguard use in sports.

== Awards and honors ==
- European Society of Sports Traumatology Knee Surgery and Arthroscopy Scholarship Award, 1994
- European Taekwondo Union Golden Honor Award for his contributions to Taekwando Sport, 2000
