= Chaucer (disambiguation) =

Geoffrey Chaucer was an English author, poet, philosopher, bureaucrat courtier, and diplomat.

Chaucer may also refer to:

- 2984 Chaucer, a small main belt asteroid
- Chaucer (crater), a lunar crater
- Chaucer (surname)
- Chaucer Group, a British insurance firm
- A variety of rose

== Education ==
- Chaucer College, an independent Anglo-Japanese college of higher education in Canterbury, UK
- Chaucer School, Canterbury, a secondary school in Kent that closed in 2015
- Chaucer School, Sheffield, a secondary school in South Yorkshire
