= Calzolari =

Calzolari is an Italian surname. Notable people with the surname include:

- Alfonso Calzolari (1887–1983), Italian cyclist
- Giacomo Calzolari (born 1969), Italian economist and Professor of Economics
- Marco Camisani Calzolari (born 1969), Italian British university professor, author, and television personality
- Pier Ugo Calzolari (1938–2012), Italian engineer
- Silvio Calzolari, Italian tug of war competitor
- Umberto Calzolari (1938–2018), Italian baseball player
