= Imperial topaz =

Geology. Minerals and stones

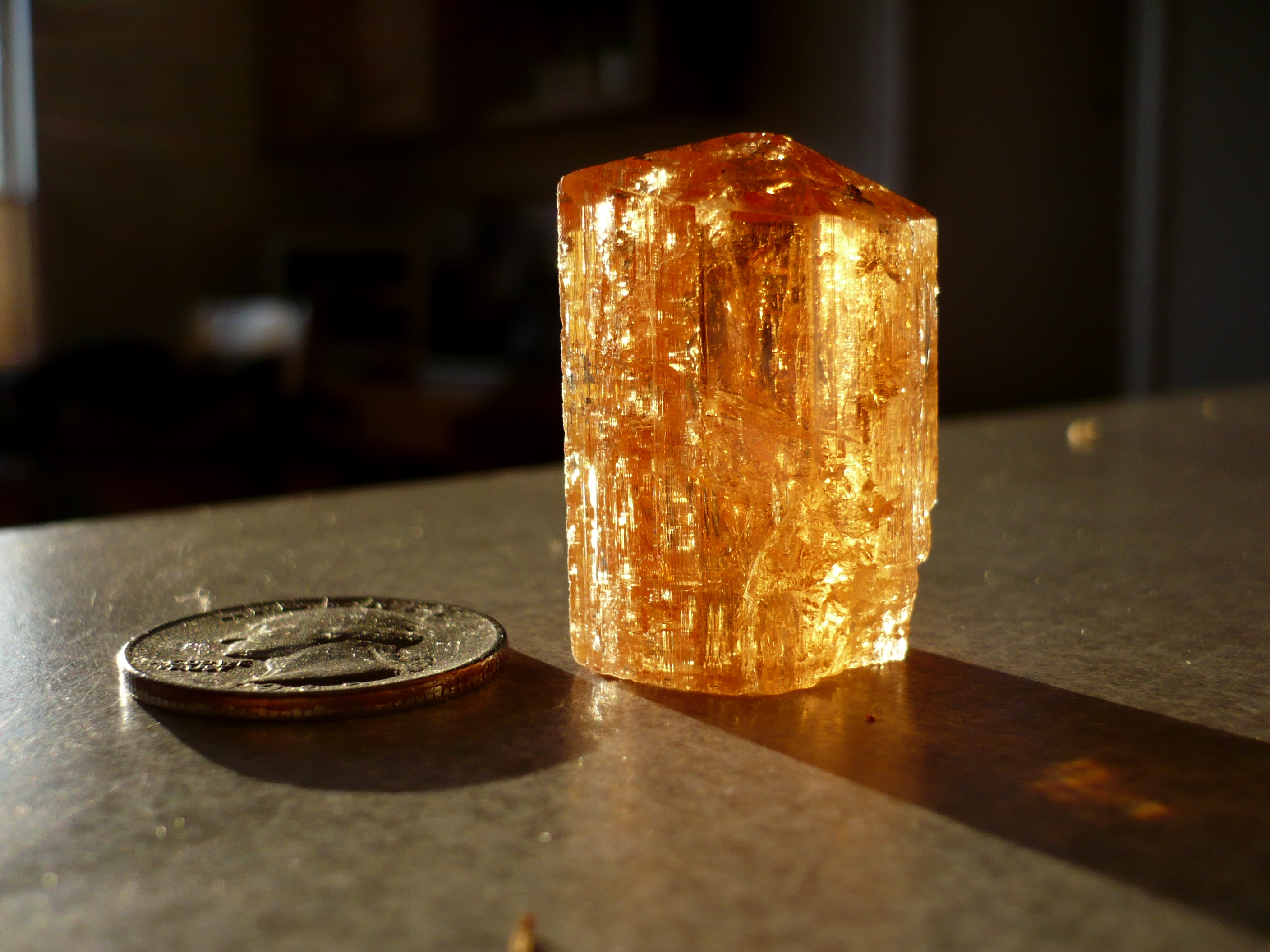
- Faceted imperial topaz from Ouro Preto, Minas Gerais, Brazil

General
- Category: Nesosilicate (variety of topaz)
- Formula: Al_{2}SiO_{4}(F,OH)_{2}
- Strunz classification: 9.AF.35
- Crystal system: Orthorhombic
- Crystal class: Dipyramidal (mmm) H–M symbol: (2/m 2/m 2/m)
- Space group: Pbnm

Identification
- Color: Golden yellow, orange, reddish-orange, pinkish-orange, pink, pinkish-purple
- Crystal habit: Prismatic crystals with rhombic cross-section
- Twinning: Rare, on {111}
- Cleavage: {001} Perfect (basal)
- Fracture: Subconchoidal to uneven
- Mohs scale hardness: 8
- Luster: Vitreous
- Streak: White
- Diaphaneity: Transparent to translucent
- Specific gravity: 3.49–3.57
- Optical properties: Biaxial (+)
- Refractive index: n_{α} = 1.606–1.629, n_{β} = 1.609–1.631, n_{γ} = 1.616–1.638
- Birefringence: δ = 0.008–0.011
- Pleochroism: Weak to moderate; X = yellow, Y = yellow-orange, Z = reddish-pink
- Ultraviolet fluorescence: Weak, yellowish-orange to greenish; largely inert under short-wave UV

Imperial topaz is a highly prized gem variety of the mineral topaz, distinguished by its warm golden, orange, and reddish-pink hues. It is classified as a nesosilicate with the chemical formula Al_{2}SiO_{4}(F,OH)_{2} and crystallises in the orthorhombic crystal system. The great majority of gem-quality material comes from a single mining district near Ouro Preto in the Brazilian state of Minas Gerais, where topaz-bearing rhyolite breccias have been exploited since the early eighteenth century. Imperial topaz is also known in the trade as precious topaz, a designation that distinguishes it from the more common blue, colourless, and yellow varieties whose lower values dominate the commercial market.

The name reflects close historical associations with royalty. Competing traditions link it either to the Russian Imperial court, whose members are said to have reserved pinkish-orange topaz from the Ural Mountains for exclusive use by the tsar's family, or to the Brazilian Imperial household during the reign of Dom Pedro II. Both narratives remain in circulation, and neither has been definitively established as the primary source of the designation.

Among all topaz varieties, natural red and reddish-orange stones of imperial quality represent less than 0.5 percent of faceted material found worldwide. This scarcity, combined with the colour stability of untreated specimens, keeps imperial topaz among the most commercially valuable silicate gemstones.

== Nomenclature ==
The adjective imperial first appears in gemological literature during the nineteenth century, but its precise origin has not been traced to a single source. One widely cited account attributes the name to the courts of imperial Russia, where pink-orange topaz from the Ural Mountains was reportedly restricted to the exclusive use of the tsar's family during the eighteenth and nineteenth centuries. A competing tradition, particularly prevalent in Brazil, connects the designation to the Brazilian imperial family, with Dom Pedro I or Dom Pedro II most frequently cited as the honoree. Portuguese sources note that the stones reached Lisbon as early as the second quarter of the eighteenth century, where they were incorporated into royal jewellery, and were initially called Brazilian rubies because of their red and reddish-orange hues.

The trade synonym precious topaz entered usage to distinguish naturally coloured material from treated stones and from other gem species sold as topaz without mineralogical justification. Both terms—imperial and precious—remain in current use by the Gemological Institute of America and other gemological bodies, although neither is an official mineralogical designation; topaz is a single mineral species, and imperial topaz refers to a colour variety rather than a separate species.

== Physical and optical properties ==
=== Crystal structure and composition ===
Imperial topaz shares the crystal chemistry of topaz in all structural respects. The mineral belongs to the orthorhombic system, space group Pbnm, with unit cell parameters of approximately a = 4.65 Å, b = 8.80 Å, c = 8.40 Å and Z = 4. Its nesosilicate framework consists of isolated SiO_{4} tetrahedra linked by aluminium ions coordinated to fluorine and hydroxyl groups in a ratio that varies between specimens. This variable F–OH substitution produces measurable differences in physical properties: fluorine-rich topaz tends toward a slightly higher specific gravity (up to 3.57) and a lower refractive index, while hydroxyl-rich specimens display the reverse trend.

The Mohs hardness is 8, making topaz one of the hardest silicate minerals and the reference mineral for that position on the scale. Despite this hardness, the crystal exhibits perfect basal cleavage in one direction ({001}), which can cause a crystal or fashioned stone to split with a sharp blow parallel to that plane regardless of hardness. Cutters must orient the stone to minimise stress along the cleavage direction, and bezel settings are generally preferred for rings to provide mechanical protection.

=== Colour and chromophores ===
Topaz is an allochromatic mineral: its colour is produced by external impurity elements or structural defects rather than by any constituent of its essential chemical formula. In imperial topaz, the principal chromophores identified by spectroscopic research are:

- Chromium (Cr^{3+}) — responsible for the natural pink, red, and violet-to-purple hues. Chromium substitutes for aluminium in the crystal structure and produces characteristic absorption bands in the visible spectrum; its presence is confirmed by electron paramagnetic resonance (EPR) spectroscopy in material from Ouro Preto.
- Colour centres (structural defects) — contribute to yellow, orange, and brownish hues. These centres are generated by natural or artificial irradiation and can be bleached by heating above approximately 450 °C, which explains both the natural fading risk and the commercial use of heat treatment to shift colour toward pink.
- Iron — detected in trace concentrations in Ouro Preto material alongside vanadium, titanium, manganese, and other elements, though iron does not appear to be a direct chromophore in the same manner as chromium.

The colour of the most prized imperial topaz is described in the trade as a medium to deep reddish-orange or orange-red, sometimes accompanied by a reddish pleochroic tone visible along one optical direction. Dealers often insist that this reddish pleochroic colour must be present for a stone to legitimately carry the imperial designation; without it, material in the golden-yellow to orange range may be sold simply as precious topaz or golden topaz. The rarest colour is pinkish-purple to purple, produced by higher chromium concentrations.

The specific trace-element fingerprint of Ouro Preto material — which includes characteristic concentrations of Ti, V, Cr, Mn, Fe, Cu, Zn, Ga, and Ge — has been used in forensic gemological studies to distinguish genuine Brazilian imperial topaz from material of other origins or from heat-treated specimens.

=== Optical properties ===
Imperial topaz is biaxial with a positive optic sign. The refractive indices range from n_{α} = 1.606–1.629, n_{β} = 1.609–1.631, and n_{γ} = 1.616–1.638, with maximum birefringence of approximately 0.008–0.011. These values are lower than those of many other gemstones of comparable colour, such as hessonite garnet, and help gemologists distinguish topaz from imitations or substitutes. The luster is vitreous. Pleochroism is typically weak to moderate, with yellow, yellowish-orange, and reddish-pink visible along three optical axes; in strongly coloured specimens the pleochroism becomes more pronounced, and correct orientation during cutting is critical to concentrating the most desirable hue in the face-up position of the finished gem.

The specific gravity of 3.49–3.57 is notably high for a silicate mineral, reflecting the dense packing of aluminium, fluorine, and hydroxyl within the nesosilicate framework. Topaz sinks in all common heavy liquids used in gemological testing, including methylene iodide (s.g. 3.33), which serves as a useful preliminary diagnostic.

Fluorescence under ultraviolet light is generally weak and variable. Material from Ouro Preto may show a faint yellowish to orange glow under long-wave UV, while short-wave UV typically produces little to no reaction. Heat-treated pink stones may show differences in fluorescence compared with untreated material, a property under preliminary investigation as a detection criterion.

== Geological occurrence ==
Topaz forms in fluorine-rich igneous environments: principally in granitic pegmatites, high-temperature hydrothermal quartz veins, and cavities within acidic volcanic rocks such as rhyolite. The presence of fluorine in pneumatolytic or hydrothermal fluids is essential for the crystallisation of the mineral, since fluorine replaces part of the hydroxyl component and stabilises the aluminium-silicate framework. Imperial topaz from Ouro Preto occurs specifically in rhyolitic volcanic breccias and associated hydrothermal veins rather than in pegmatites, which distinguishes its geological setting from many other topaz deposits worldwide.

The Ouro Preto district lies within the Quadrilátero Ferrífero of Minas Gerais, a geologically complex region characterised by Proterozoic greenstone belts, banded iron formations, and later granitic intrusions. The topaz mineralisation is hosted in a sequence of Neoproterozoic rhyolitic volcanic rocks that underwent hydrothermal alteration; fluorine-rich fluids circulating through fractures and breccia zones deposited topaz, fluorite, cassiterite, and associated minerals at temperatures typical of the upper hydrothermal regime. Crystals are typically recovered from a weathered clay-rich saprolite overlying the primary rock, where long-term tropical weathering has disaggregated the host and concentrated the resistant topaz in an eluvial or colluvial matrix easily processed by hydraulic methods.

Beyond Brazil, occurrences of topaz in the imperial colour range are known from the Ural Mountains of Russia (historically significant), as well as from Nigeria, Pakistan (principally the Katlang area of Khyber Pakhtunkhwa province), and Sri Lanka, though none of these localities consistently produces material of the colour saturation and warmth associated with the finest Brazilian specimens.

== Mining ==
=== Ouro Preto district ===
The mining district centred on Ouro Preto is the world's dominant source of imperial topaz and has been so continuously since the early eighteenth century. The city of Ouro Preto — whose name translates as black gold in Portuguese, a reference to the gold-laden black limonite found during the Brazilian gold rush of the early 1700s — is a UNESCO World Heritage Site, and the topaz mines lie several kilometres outside its colonial centre, in the valleys of the Maracujá and Velhas river sub-basins.

The principal operations include:

- Capão do Lana mine (informally the Capão mine), located near the village of Rodrigo Silva approximately 15 km west of Ouro Preto. Recognised as the oldest and historically most productive mechanised imperial topaz mine, it has operated since the early nineteenth century. Two open pits are worked with bulldozers, water cannons, and drag scrapers, removing a thick brown clay overburden to expose the topaz-bearing rhyolite breccia beneath. The operation yields a broad range of crystal sizes and colours; approximate annual production has been documented at around 12 kilograms of gem rough (roughly 30,000 carats), with an estimated 400 cubic metres of clay processed per day.
- Vermelhão mine, situated on the outskirts of Ouro Preto, also a long-established producer of coloured topaz crystals.
- Smaller operations including the Boa Vista and José Corrêa mines, which supplement production from the two principal sites.

Artisanal and semi-mechanised recovery is common alongside the more mechanically sophisticated operations. Material is separated from the clay overburden by washing grates and jigs that exploit the high specific gravity of topaz relative to the gangue. Recovered crystals range from opaque fragments to large, transparent prismatic specimens; only a small percentage of rough production achieves the colour saturation required for cut gem material, and an even smaller fraction reaches the rarest red and pinkish-purple grades.

=== Other localities ===
Historical Russian production from the Ural Mountains, while important in establishing the prestige of imperial-coloured topaz in European courts, is today of very limited commercial significance. Small quantities of topaz in the golden to pinkish-orange colour range are also produced in Nigeria, Sri Lanka, and the Katlang area of Pakistan, where material is marketed under the imperial topaz designation but is often distinguished from Ouro Preto material by trace-element analysis and colour character.

== Gemology and trade ==
=== Quality factors ===
Colour is the predominant value driver in imperial topaz. The highest prices are commanded by stones displaying an intense, saturated reddish-orange to orange-red bodycolour with a visible reddish pleochroic flash; such material is sometimes described as flame colour in the trade. Below that grade, pure oranges, golden oranges, and peachy pinks occupy descending price tiers. Natural pink and reddish imperial topaz of any size is genuinely rare: red stones represent less than 0.5 percent of all gem-quality topaz found.

Clarity is typically high in imperial topaz; most gem-quality material is eye-clean to loupe-clean, a characteristic that contributes to the stone's vitreous brilliance. Size has a disproportionate effect on per-carat price because large, well-coloured stones are much rarer than small ones: price-per-carat rates commonly increase at thresholds around 2, 5, and 10 carats.

Expert cutting is particularly important for imperial topaz because the stone's pleochroism means that different hues appear along different optical directions. If the table facet is not oriented to display the face-up bodycolour rather than the secondary pleochroic hue, the finished gem may concentrate undesirable yellowish or brownish tones at the culet or the ends of elongated shapes such as ovals and pears.

=== Treatments ===
A significant portion of the pink topaz sold in the market has undergone heat treatment. Brownish-yellow or orange imperial topaz from Ouro Preto can be heated to temperatures above approximately 450 °C to bleach or modify colour centres, producing pink to peach colours that are stable under normal conditions. This treatment is widely practised and, if disclosed, is commercially accepted; the resulting pink stones command lower prices than naturally pink specimens of equivalent colour.

Heat treatment can be detected through fluorescence testing under ultraviolet light, though no single criterion is definitive, and gemological laboratories rely on a combination of spectroscopic methods. Colour-coating processes, which apply thin metallic oxide films to topaz pavilions to create iridescent or non-standard colours, are not used for genuine imperial topaz; they are associated with commercial mystic topaz and similar treated products marketed as entirely separate varieties.

Blue topaz, which dominates the commercial topaz market by volume, is produced by irradiating colourless topaz followed by heat treatment; this process is unrelated to imperial topaz.

=== Distinction from other varieties ===
Imperial topaz in the orange-red colour range may superficially resemble hessonite (orange-brown garnet), spessartine, mandarin garnet, fire opal, or coloured citrine. Diagnostic separation relies on the refractive index (topaz's value of approximately 1.61–1.64 is distinctly lower than that of garnets), the biaxial positive optic character (distinguishing it from uniaxial stones such as zircon), the characteristic specific gravity of 3.49–3.57, and the perfect basal cleavage. Compared with peridot — another biaxial mineral — topaz has lower refractive indices.

== Notable specimens ==
The Whitney Flame Topaz, a 48.86-carat red topaz acquired by the Smithsonian Institution through the support of philanthropist Coralyn Wright Whitney and unveiled at the National Museum of Natural History in Washington, D.C. in September 2018, is considered one of the finest examples of imperial topaz in any public collection. Its vivid red colour results from trace quantities of chromium incorporated into the crystal during growth; the gem had been held privately for several decades before its acquisition by the museum.

The Blaze Imperial Topaz, a faceted stone weighing 97.45 carats, is displayed at the Field Museum of Natural History in Chicago and is frequently cited as one of the largest known cut imperial topaz gems of golden-orange colour.

The Smithsonian's National Museum of Natural History also holds a 875.4-carat imperial topaz crystal and a 93.6-carat cut stone (NMNH G3401) from Ouro Preto, both donated from the Washington A. Roebling Collection and on display in the Janet Annenberg Hooker Hall of Geology, Gems, and Minerals.

== In jewellery ==
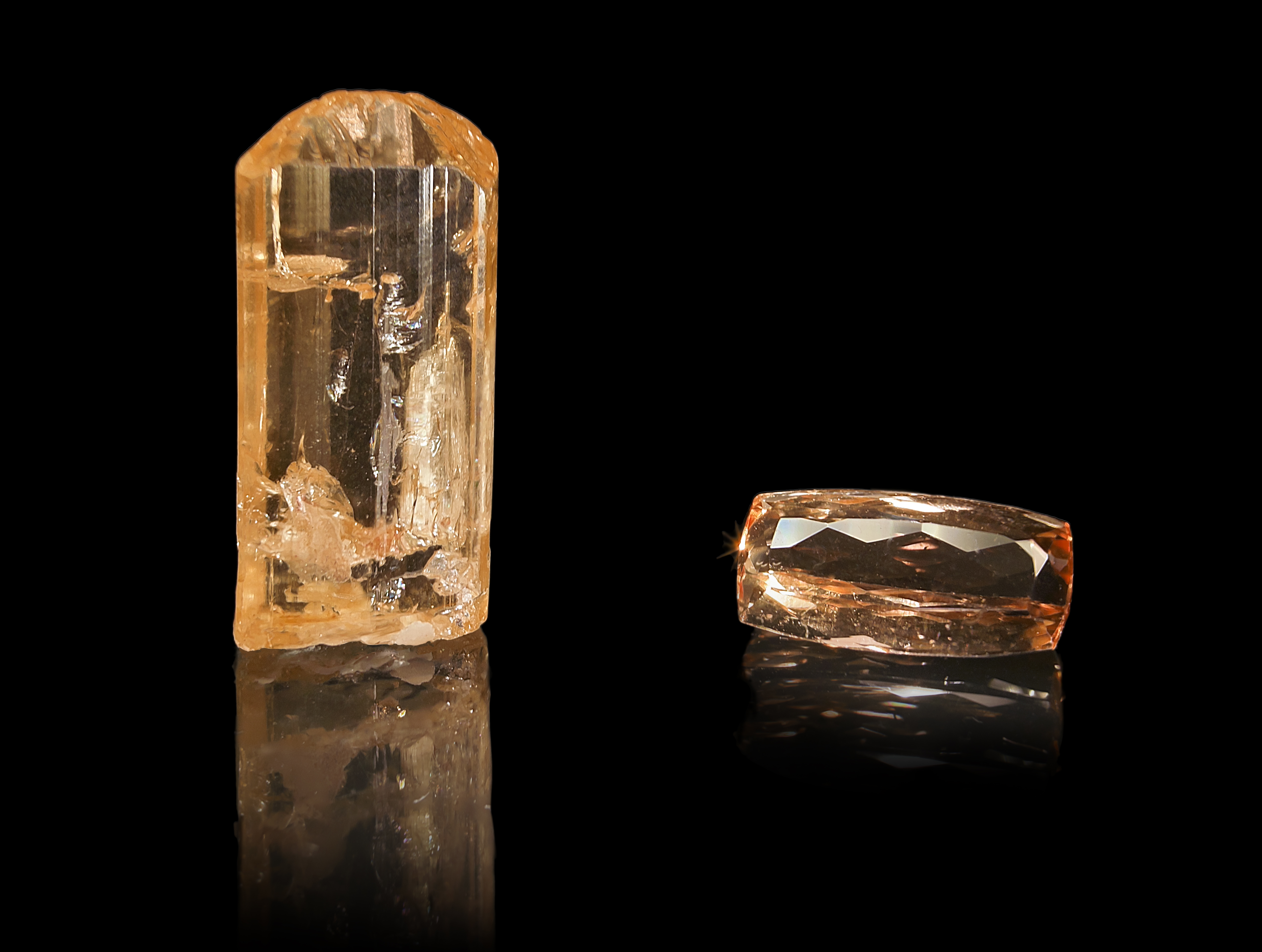
Brazilian Imperial Topaz

Imperial topaz has been used in fine jewellery since at least the mid-eighteenth century, when Portuguese craftsmen incorporated Brazilian material into ecclesiastical and court pieces. Surviving examples include components of the Custody of the Patriarchal Cathedral of Lisbon and devotional jewellery associated with the cult of Senhor Santo Cristo dos Milagres in Ponta Delgada, Azores. By the nineteenth century, Brazilian imperial topaz was a recognised commodity in European gemstone markets and appeared in the inventories of major noble houses.

In contemporary jewellery, the stone is set in rings, pendants, earrings, and bracelets. Because of the perfect basal cleavage, bezel settings that protect the girdle from sharp blows are generally preferred over prong settings for rings; ultrasonic cleaning machines are also to be avoided, as vibration can induce cleavage along the basal plane.

Topaz is one of the birthstones for November in the modern birthstone list adopted by the Jewelers of America in 1912.

== See also ==
- Gemstone
