= Lastre =

Lastre is a surname. Notable people with the surname include:

- Carlos Lastre (born 1950), Cuban weightlifter
- Yunio Lastre (born 1981), Cuban discus thrower

== See also ==
- Laster (surname)
