= Worth Ave. Group =

American consumer electronics insurance provider

Worth Ave Group
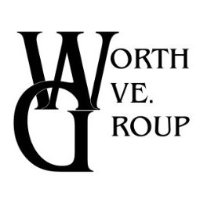
- Company type: Private
- Industry: Insurance
- Founded: 1972; 54 years ago
- Headquarters: Stillwater, Oklahoma, United States
- Products: Insurance for consumer electronics and student property
- Website: www.worthavegroup.com

Worth Ave. Group is an American consumer electronics insurance provider based in Stillwater, Oklahoma.

The company is best known for offering iPhone insurance policies. Worth Ave. Group was formed from National Student Services Inc., one of the nation's largest insurers of college students’ personal property. Worth Ave. Group's insurance policies are underwritten by Hanover Insurance Group. The company was founded in 1972.

The company also researches and provides data to the public on smartphone and technology gadget usage, including insurance and usage rates.

== Awards ==
- 2014 Bronze Stevie Award by American Business Awards
- The Fantastic New and Cheaper Way to get Product Warranties for Your Expensive Electronic Devices by Good Morning America
- Options to Keep You Mobile by KFOR4
