= Topaz =

Silicate mineral

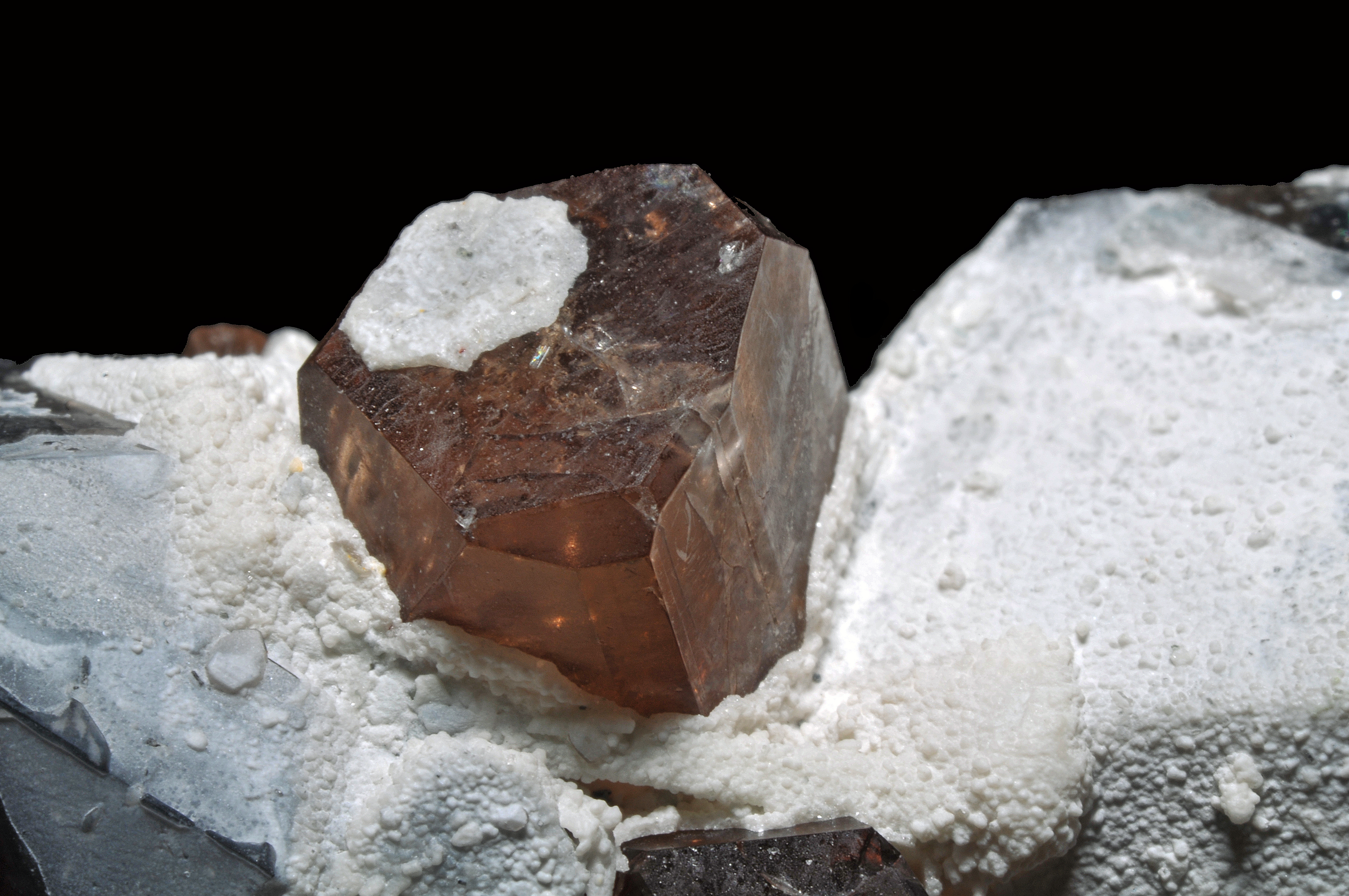
- Topaz crystal on white matrix

General
- Category: Nesosilicate
- Formula: Al_{2}SiO_{4}(F, OH)_{2}
- IMA symbol: Tpz
- Strunz classification: 9.AF.35
- Crystal system: Orthorhombic
- Crystal class: Dipyramidal (mmm); H–M symbol: (2/m 2/m 2/m)
- Space group: Pbnm
- Unit cell: a = 4.65 Å, b = 8.8 Å, c = 8.4 Å; Z = 4

Identification
- Color: Colorless (if impurities are absent), white, blue, brown, orange, gray, yellow, yellowish brown, green, pink, reddish pink, or even red
- Crystal habit: Prismatic crystal
- Twinning: Rarely on [111]
- Cleavage: [001] Perfect
- Fracture: Subconchoidal to uneven
- Mohs scale hardness: 8 (defining mineral)
- Luster: Vitreous
- Streak: Grayish White
- Diaphaneity: Transparent
- Specific gravity: 3.49–3.57
- Optical properties: Biaxial (+)
- Refractive index: n_{α} = 1.606–1.629 n_{β} = 1.609–1.631 n_{γ} = 1.616–1.638
- Birefringence: δ = 0.010
- Pleochroism: Weak in thick sections X = yellow; Y = yellow, violet, reddish; Z = violet, bluish, yellow, pink
- Ultraviolet fluorescence: Golden yellow under short UV; cream under long UV

Topaz is a silicate mineral containing aluminum and fluorine with the chemical formula Al_{2}SiO_{4}(F, OH)_{2}. It is used as a gemstone in jewelry and other adornments. Common topaz in its natural state is colorless, though trace element impurities can make it pale blue or golden-brown to yellow-orange. Topaz is often treated with heat or radiation to make it a deep blue, reddish-orange, pale green, pink, or purple.

Topaz is a nesosilicate mineral, and more specifically, an aluminosilicate mineral. It is one of the hardest naturally occurring minerals and has a relatively low index of refraction. It has the orthorhombic crystal system and a dipyramidial crystal class.

It occurs in many places in the world. Two of the most popular places that topaz is sourced are Brazil and Russia. Topaz is often mined in open-pit or alluvial settings.

== Etymology ==
The word "topaz" is usually believed to be derived (via Old French: Topace and Latin: Topazius) from the Greek Τοπάζιος (Topázios) or Τοπάζιον (Topázion), from Τοπαζος. This is the ancient name of St. John's Island in the Red Sea which was difficult to find and from which a yellow stone (now believed to be chrysolite: yellowish olivine) was mined in ancient times. The name topaz was first applied to the mineral now known by that name in 1737. Ancient Sri Lanka (Tamraparni) exported topazes to Greece and ancient Egypt, which led to the etymologically related names of the island by Alexander Polyhistor (Topazius) and the early Egyptians (Topapwene) – "land of the Topaz". Pliny said that Topazos is a legendary island in the Red Sea and the mineral "topaz" was first mined there. Alternatively, the word topaz may be related to the Sanskrit word तपस् "tapas", meaning "heat" or "fire".

== History ==
Thomas Nicols, the author of one of the first systematic treatises on minerals and gemstones, dedicated two chapters to the topic in 1652. In the Middle Ages, the name topaz was used to refer to any yellow gemstone, but in modern times it denotes only the silicate described above.

Many English translations of the Bible, including the King James Version, mention topaz. However, because these translations as topaz all derive from the Septuagint translation topazi[os], which referred to a yellow stone that was not topaz, but probably chrysolite (chrysoberyl or peridot), topaz is likely not meant here.

An English superstition also held that topaz cured lunacy. The ancient Romans believed that topaz provided protection from danger while traveling. During the Middle Ages, it was believed that attaching the topaz to the left arm protected the owner from any curse and warded off the evil eye. It was also believed that wearing topaz increased body heat, which would enable people to relieve a cold or fever. In Europe during the Middle Ages, topaz was believed to enhance mental powers. In India, people believed topaz granted beauty, intelligence, and longevity when worn over the heart.

== Gemstone ==
Topaz is a gemstone. In cut and polished form, it is used to make jewelry or other adornments. Lower quality topaz is commonly used as an abrasive material due to its hardness and it is used to produce refractory materials for high temperature environments. Topaz can be used as a flux in steel production. Using topaz as a refectory material does have some health and environmental concerns due to the production of fluorine as a byproduct of calcining topaz.

Topaz is a part of the second rank of gemstones, or semiprecious stones, accompanying aquamarine, morganite, and tourmaline. The first rank of gemstones, or precious stones, includes ruby, sapphire, diamond, and emerald.

Orange topaz, also known as precious topaz, is the birthstone for the month of November, the symbol of friendship, and the state gemstone of the U.S. state of Utah. Blue topaz is the state gemstone of the US state of Texas. The 4th wedding anniversary gem is blue topaz and the 23rd is imperial topaz.

Synthetic topaz can be produced using a method that includes the thermal hydrolysis of SiO_{2} and AlF_{3}. When these compounds are heated to temperatures of 750° to 850 °C topaz is formed. Another method uses a combination of amorphous Al_{2}O_{3}, Na_{2}SiF_{6}, and water which is heated to a temperature of 500 °C, put under a pressure of 4000 bars, and left for 9 days.

To care for a topaz gemstone, it is best to avoid ultrasonic cleaners or steam as this could produce small fractures within the crystal. Warm water with soap is the best way to wash it.

To choose an ethically sourced topaz gemstone, it is recommended to search for a stone for which the seller knows the origin.

== Structure ==
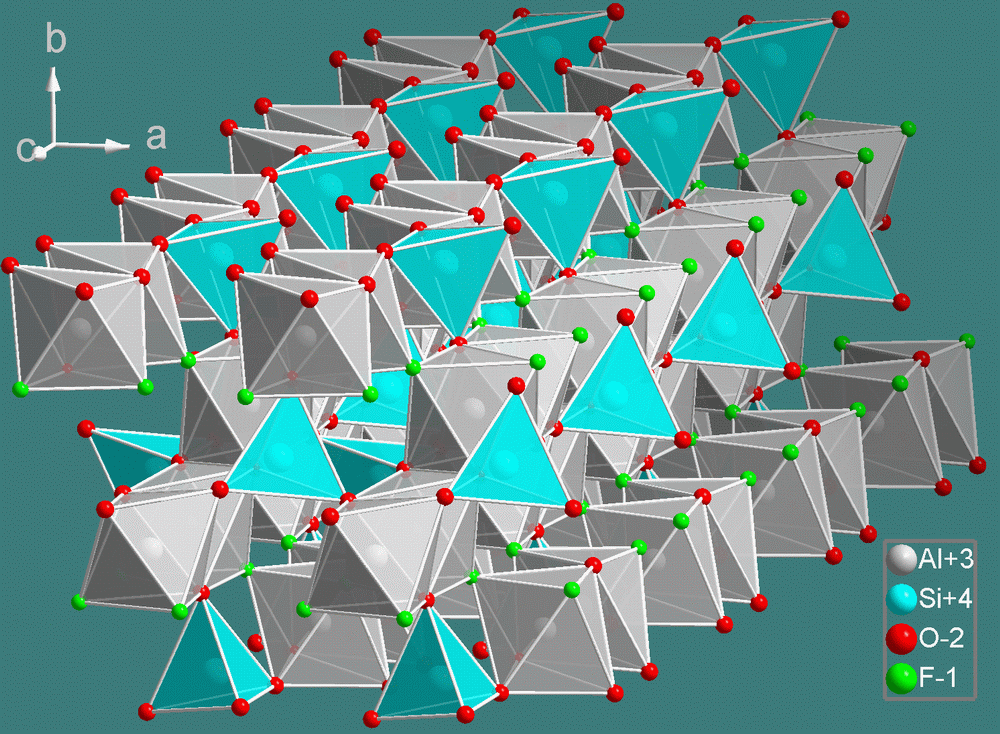
Topaz's crystal structure using polyhedrons showcasing the aluminum octahedron (grey), silica tetrahedron (blue), oxygen (red), and fluorine (green).

Topaz is an accessory mineral to felsic igneous, sedimentary, and hydrothermally altered rocks.

The crystal structure of topaz alternates between sheets of (F, OH)_{2}O and O along (010) with Al^{3+} occupying the octahedral sites and Si^{4+} in the tetrahedral sites. Fluorine can be substituted by hydroxide in topaz by up to 30 mol.% in nature and hydroxide-dominating topaz can be made in laboratories but has not been found in nature.

On occasion, cavities can be found within topaz and they are filled with a liquid called brewsterlinite. Brewsterlinite was discovered by David Brewster upon heating a sample of topaz. After heating, the topaz lost mass, and through examination Brewster concluded Topaz was formed in a wet environment creating these liquid-filled cavities. This liquid is a hydrocarbon with a refractive index of 1·13.

Topaz's crystal habit takes many forms. It can display a range of slender and long crystals to bulky and short. There can also be variation in the terminations displaying blunt, pyramidal, chisel, or wedge-shaped terminations. The perfect cleavage {001} in topaz breaks no Si-O bonds within its structure and only breaks Al-O and Al-F bonds. This cleavage is diagnostic for this mineral. The 2V optical angle in topaz can range from 48° to 69.5°. Low fluorine content yields a smaller angle and high fluorine content yields a larger angle.

== Characteristics ==
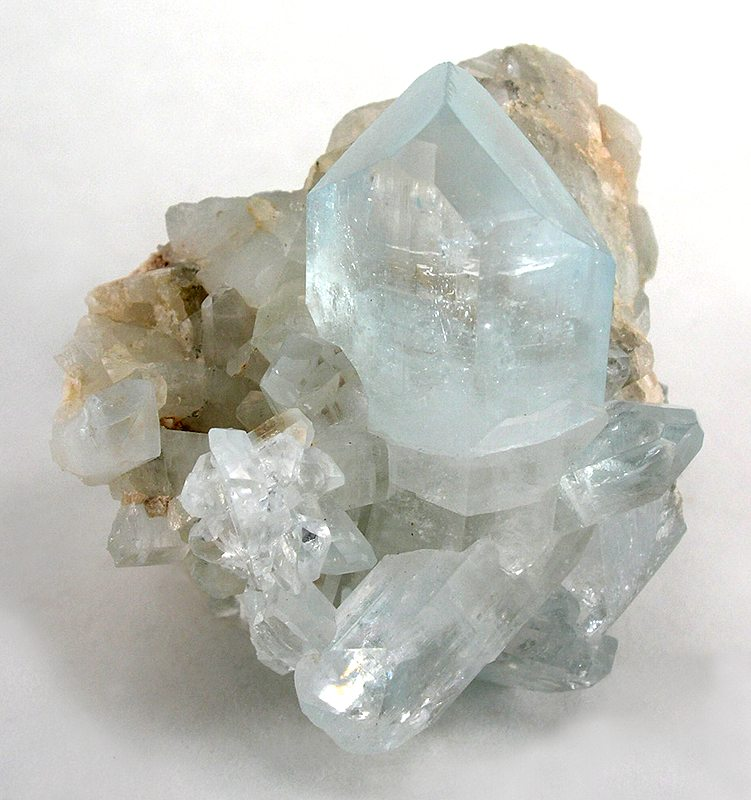
Blue topaz crystal

Topaz in its natural state is colorless, often with a greyish cast. It also occurs as a golden brown to yellow color which makes it sometimes confused with citrine, a less valuable gemstone. The specific gravity of all shades of topaz, however, means that it is considerably heavier than citrine (about 25% per volume) and this difference in weight can be used to distinguish two stones of equal volume. Likewise, glass stones are also much lighter than equally sized topaz.

A variety of impurities and treatments may make topaz wine red, pale gray, reddish-orange, pale green, or pink (rare), and opaque to translucent/transparent. The pink and red varieties come from chromium replacing aluminium in its crystalline structure.

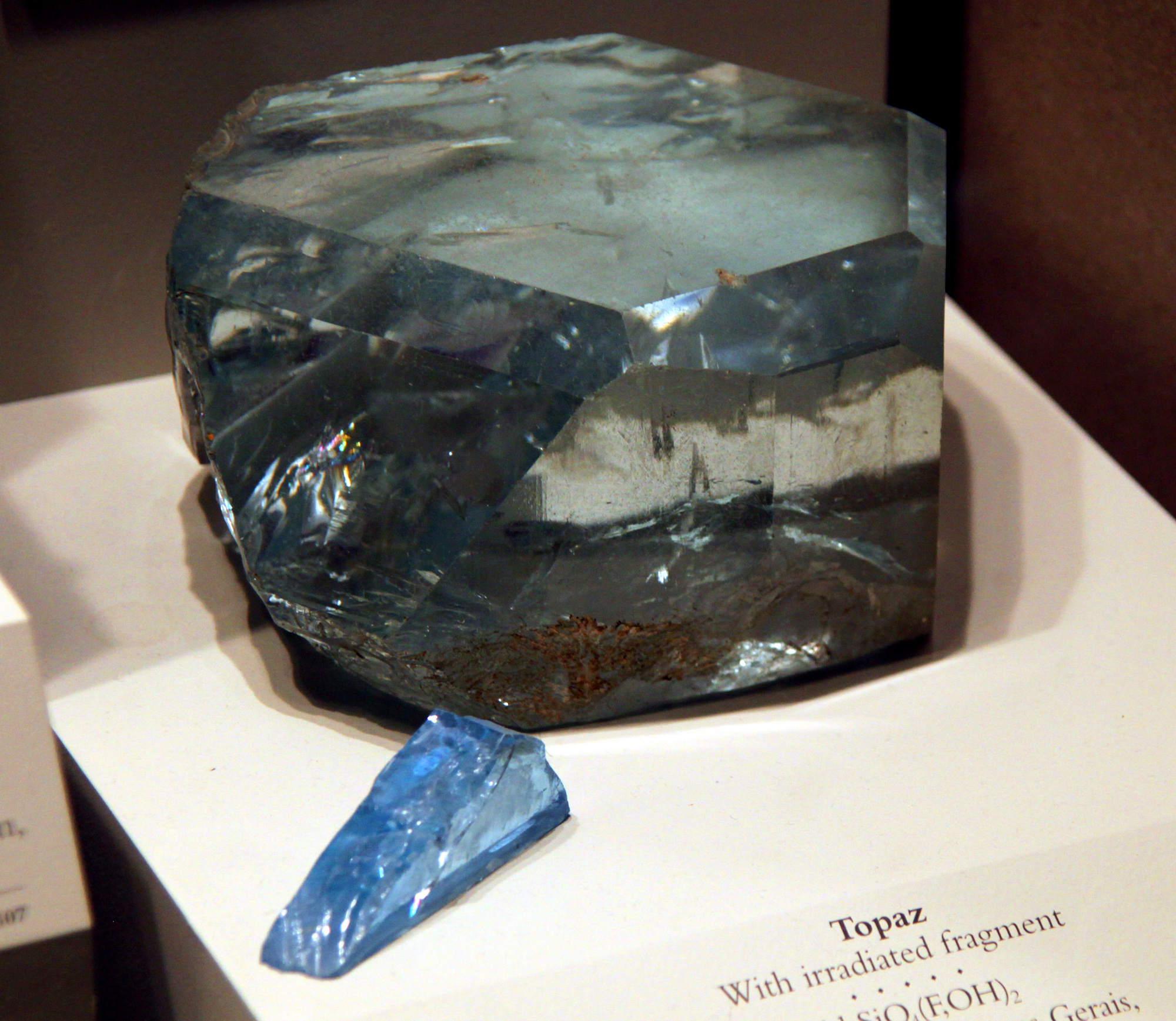
Large topaz gemstone and small irradiated topaz fragment on display at the Smithsonian Museum of Natural History.

Imperial topaz is yellow, pink (rare, if natural), or pink-orange. Brazilian imperial topaz can often have a bright yellow to deep golden brown hue, sometimes even violet. Many brown or pale topazes are treated to make them bright yellow, gold, pink, or violet colored. Some imperial topaz stones can fade from exposure to sunlight for an extended period of time. Naturally occurring blue topaz is quite rare. Typically, colorless, gray, or pale yellow and blue material is heat treated and irradiated to produce a more desired darker blue. Mystic topaz is a colorless topaz that has been artificially coated via a vapor deposition process giving it a rainbow effect on its surface.

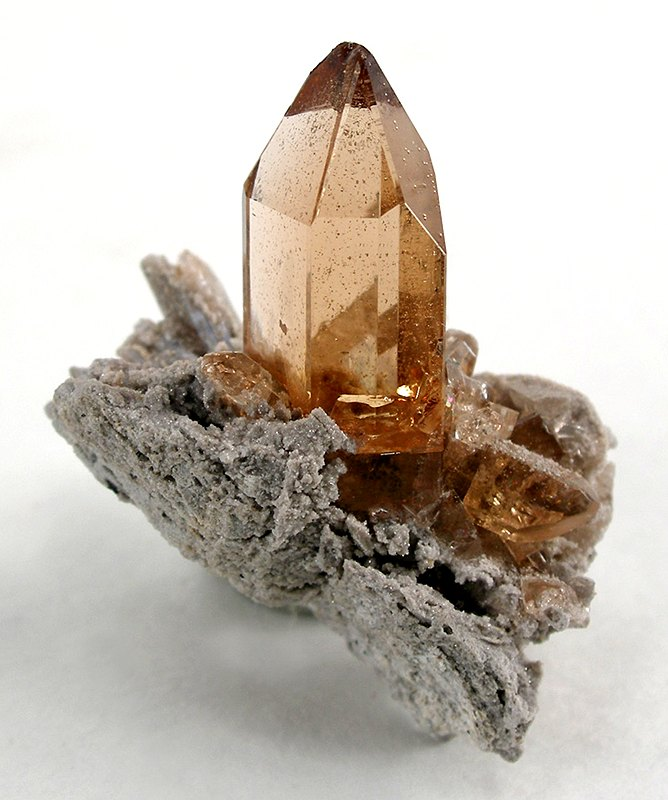
Sherry-colored topaz from Utah, USA

Although very hard, topaz must be treated with greater care than some other minerals of similar hardness (such as corundum) because of a weakness of chemical bonding of the stone's ionic components along one or another axial plane (whereas diamonds, for example, are composed of carbon atoms bonded to each other with equal strength along all of its planes). This gives topaz a tendency to break along such a cleavage plane if struck with sufficient force.

Topaz has a relatively low index of refraction for a gemstone, and so stones with large facets or tables do not sparkle as readily as stones cut from minerals with higher refractive indices, though quality colorless topaz sparkles and shows more "life" than similarly cut quartz. When given a typical "brilliant" cut, topaz may either show a sparkling table facet surrounded by dead-looking crown facets or a ring of sparkling crown facets with a dull well-like table. It also takes an exceptionally fine polish, and can sometimes be distinguished from citrine by its slippery feel alone (quartz cannot be polished to this level of smoothness).

Another method of distinguishing topaz from quartz is by placing the unset stone in a solution of bromoform or methylene iodide. Quartz will invariably float in these solutions, whereas topaz will sink.

== Localities and occurrence ==
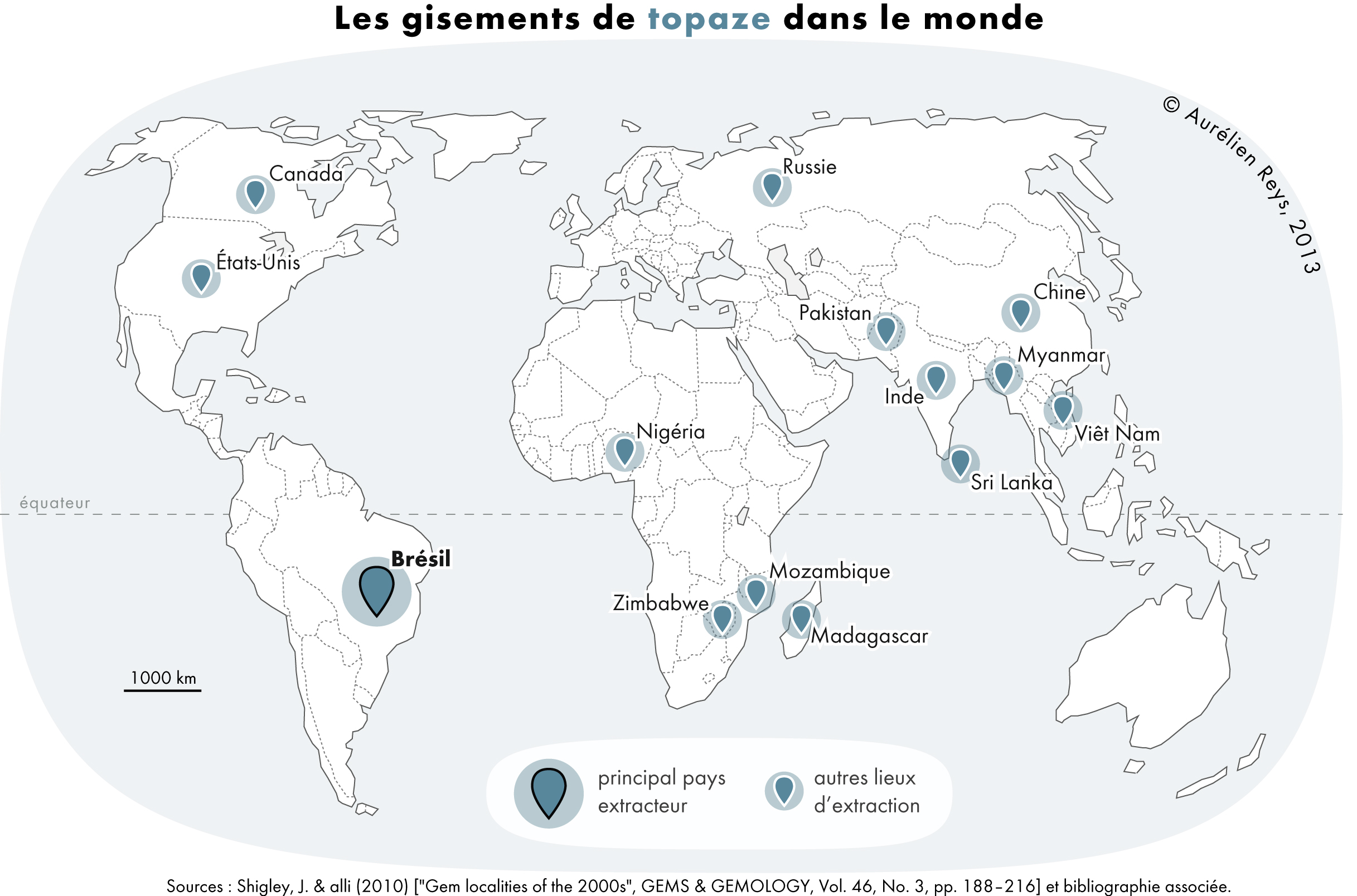
Main topaz producing countries

Topaz is commonly associated with silicic igneous rocks of the granite and rhyolite type. It typically crystallizes in granitic pegmatites or in vapor cavities in rhyolite lava flows including those at Topaz Mountain in western Utah and Chivinar in South America. It can be found with fluorite and cassiterite in various areas including the Ural and Ilmensky mountains of Russia, Afghanistan, Sri Lanka, the Czech Republic, Germany, Norway, Pakistan, Italy, Sweden, Japan, Brazil, Mexico; Flinders Island, Australia; Nigeria, Ukraine and the United States. Topaz was found around the time of the 1700s in a pegmatite formation within the central Urals Mountains in Russia.

Brazil is one of the largest producers of topaz, some clear topaz crystals from Brazilian pegmatites can reach boulder size and weigh hundreds of pounds. The Topaz of Aurangzeb, observed by Jean Baptiste Tavernier weighed 157.75 carats (31.550 g). The American Golden Topaz, a more recent gem, weighed 22,892.5 carats (4,578.50 g). Large, vivid blue topaz specimens from the St. Anns mine in Zimbabwe were found in the late 1980s. Colorless and light-blue varieties of topaz are found in Precambrian granite in Mason County, Texas within the Llano Uplift. There is no commercial mining of topaz in that area. It is possible to synthesize topaz.

== Mining ==
Large-scale topaz mining typically uses open pit and underground mining to extract the gem. The waste material is discarded using large machines to transport it away while the valuable ore is washed and sorted to recover the topaz gems. In smaller-scale mines, dry sieving is used in alluvial environments by shoveling the material into sieves to separate the gems from unwanted dust and debris. The topaz can then be selected by hand from the remaining material. Mined topaz is then sent to be processed for use in jewelry by polishing the gem and treating it to achieve the desired color.

Mining for topaz can cause some environmental concerns mostly associated with larger-scale operations. The introduction of a large open pit mine into an environment leads to modification of the land around it to make it accessible to workers. After use of such mines is over, they are often refilled with loose sediments left over from the mining process. These loose sediments can be washed away to other areas, cutting off water features, destroying farmland, and creating a threat of landslides. The pollution produced by mining can impact the environment around it and damage its health. Deforestation undergone to create the mine, along with the machinery used during the mining process, adds greenhouse gasses to the atmosphere. Deforestation also removes habitats and biodiversity from a large area of natural space. These disruptions to the ecosystem can be challenging to wildlife and local populations. Water, also a large component of mining operations, is drawn away from neighboring communities to create a lack of water. Tailings leftover from the mining process can leach contaminants into nearby water systems and can contaminate the drinking water of local communities.

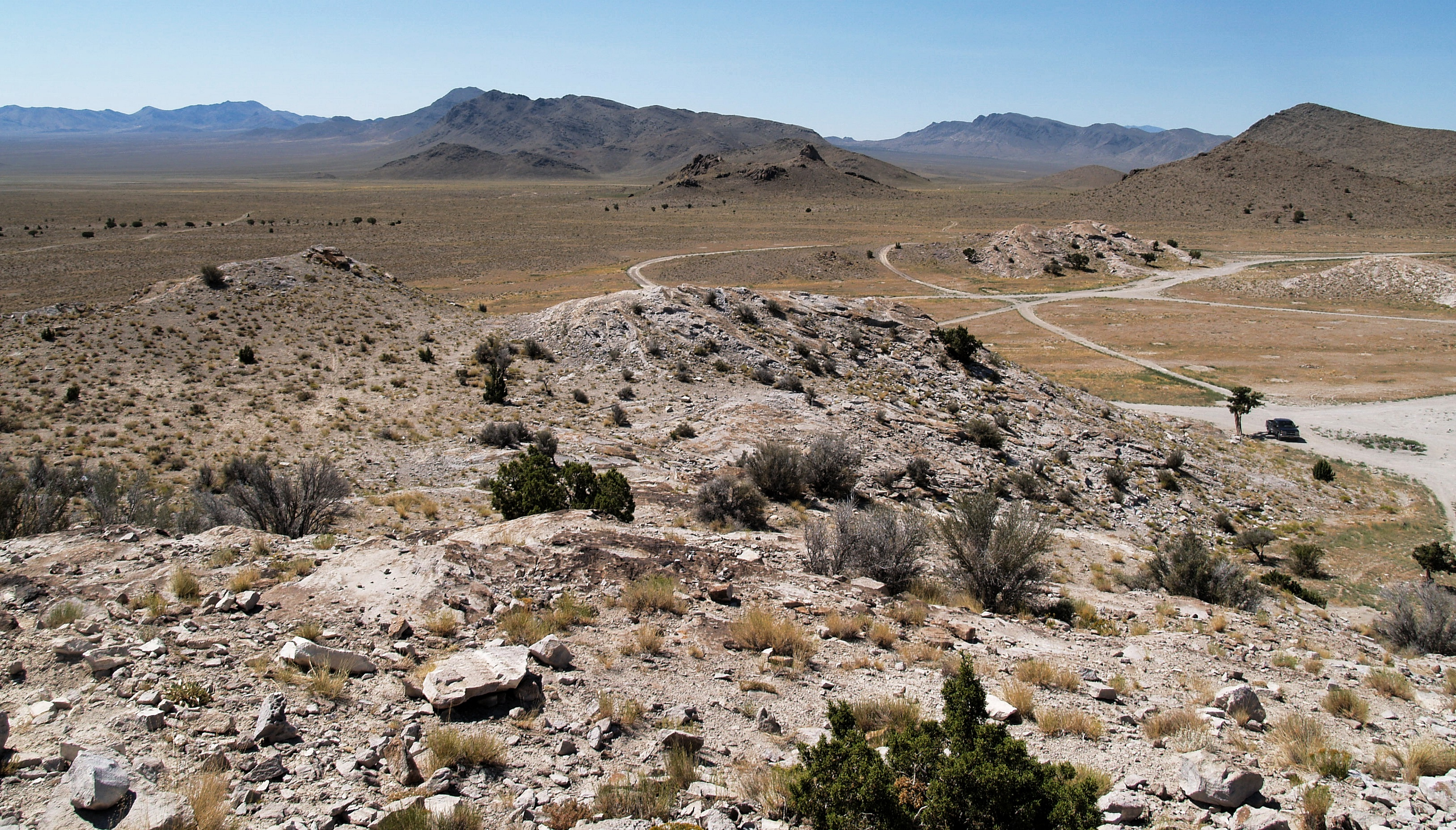
Topaz Mountain, Utah, United States

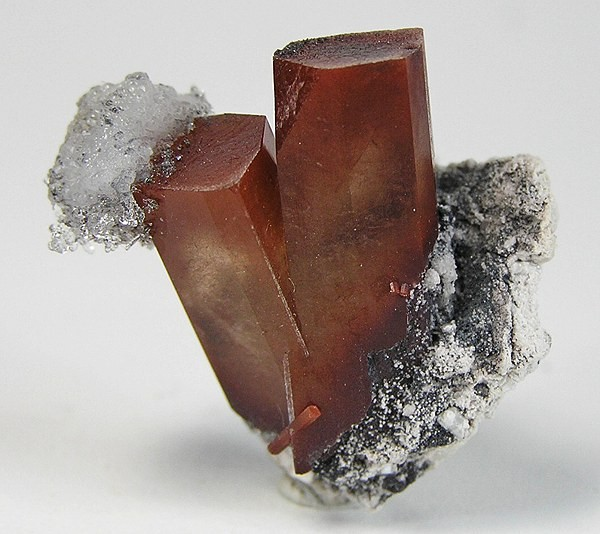
Red topaz from Tepetate, Municipio de Villa de Arriaga, San Luis Potosí, Mexico

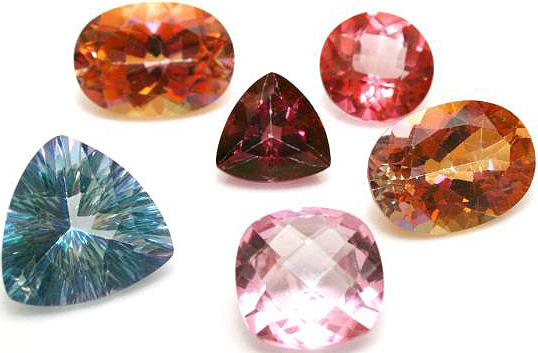
Facet cut topaz gemstones in various colors

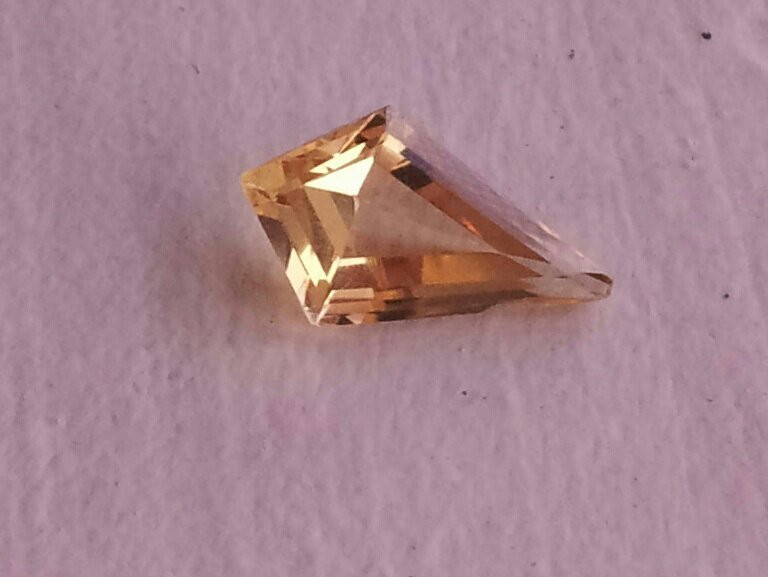
Yellow topaz in stepped kite-shaped cut

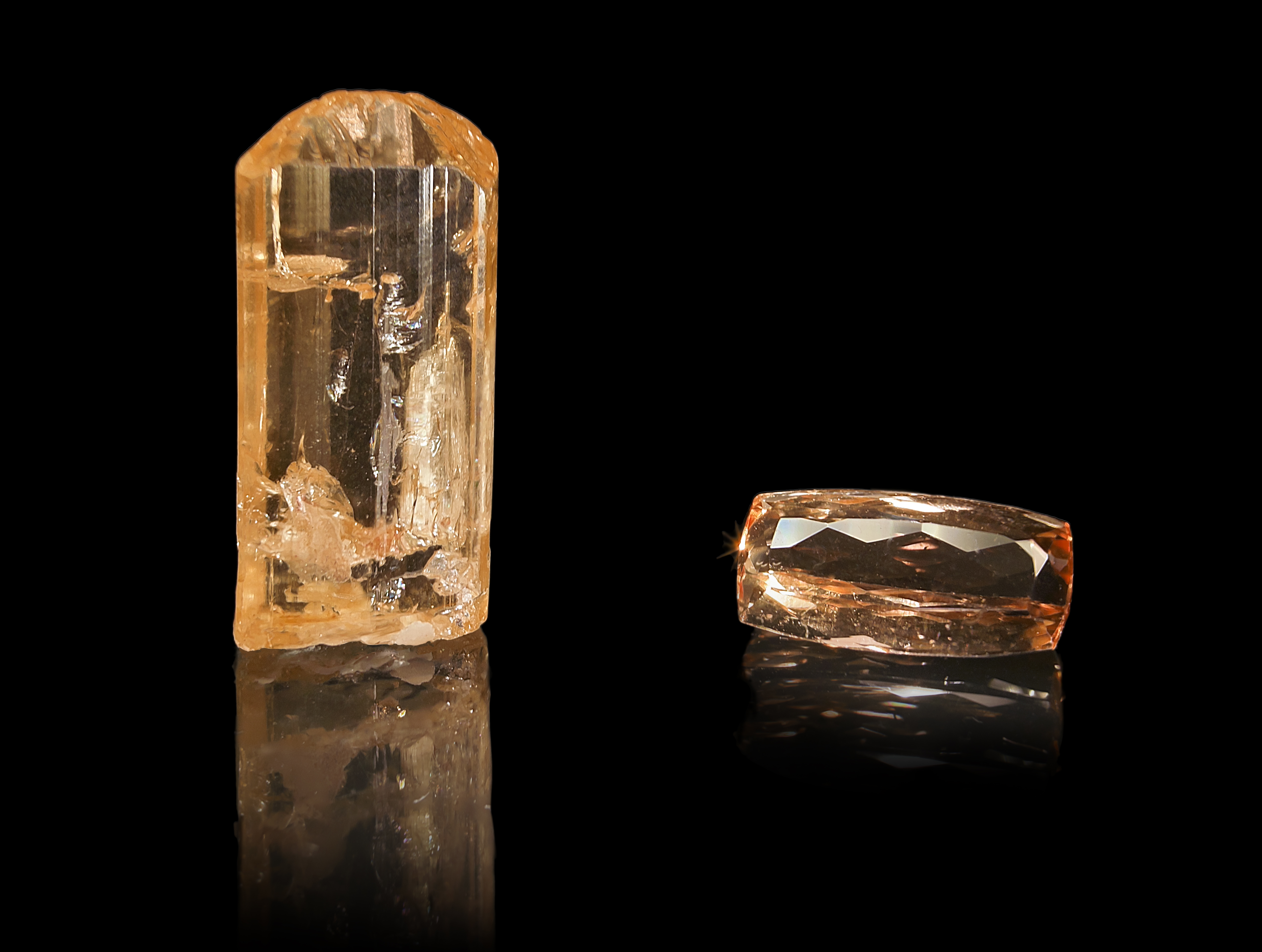
Imperial Topaz of Minas Gerais

== See also ==
- Agate
- Beryl
- Opal
