= Luster (surname) =

Luster is a surname. Notable people with the surname include:

- Ahrue Luster, guitarist, also played the piano
- Andrew Luster (born 1963), heir to the Max Factor cosmetics fortune and convicted multiple rapist
- Betty Luster (1922–2011), American television actress, singer, and dancer
- Dewey Luster (1899–1980), head coach of the Oklahoma Sooners college football team
- Keldric Luster (born 2005), American football player
- Leo Luster (1927–2017), Austrian Holocaust survivor
- Marv Luster (1937–2020), Canadian Football League player
- Scott Luster, women's volleyball coach
- June Christy (1925–1990), American jazz singer born Shirley Luster
