= Last (surname) =

Last is a surname. Notable people with the surname include:

- James Last (1929–2015), German composer and big-band leader
- Joan Mary Last (1908–2002), English music educator, pianist and composer
- John M. Last (1926-2019), Canadian public health educator
- Robert Last (disambiguation), multiple people
- Werner Last (1926–1982), German bandleader, better known as Kai Warner
- William Isaac Last (1857–1911), English engineer and Director of the Science Museum, London
