= Mr. B Natural =

1956 short film sponsored by C. G. Conn company directed by Phil Patton

- Mr. B Natural as featured on Mystery Science Theater 3000
- Directed by: Phil Patton
- Written by: Marvin David
- Produced by: Kling Film Productions
- Starring: Betty Luster; Bruce Podewell
- Cinematography: David Savitt
- Edited by: Arthur Ellis
- Music by: Bernie Saber
- Release date: 1956
- Running time: 26 min 40 sec
- Country: United States

Mr. B Natural is a short sponsored film produced in 1956 by Kling Film Productions for the C.G. Conn Company, directed by Phil Patton. It is also the name of the film's main character, played by Betty Luster.

The short was intended to be shown in classrooms and school assemblies to promote children's interest in learning a brass instrument. It fell into obscurity until it was satirized in an episode of Mystery Science Theater 3000 that first aired on November 30, 1991, after which it was celebrated as one of the best shorts in the history of the show.

== Title character ==
Mr. B Natural is an androgynous figure, a "hep pixie" who is meant to embody the "spirit of fun in music". In this capacity, the character inspires children to take up band instruments. The name is a pun on the musical notation B♮ (B natural), as the character explains: "that's what your feelings of music are, as natural as you can be."

The character also acts as a kind of nascent brand mascot for C.G. Conn musical instruments, though Mr. B Natural made no appearances for the company beyond the one film.

Conn provided details about the film in the Spring 1957 issue of their magazine, The Baton, distributed to public school music teachers: "Mr. B Natural is the spirit of music in everyone...a sort of LepreCONN who is always no more than an inch away from the fingertips of anyone. Mr. B has a code, however, that prohibits him from showing himself for anyone unless he reaches out and calls for the spirit of music. In full color, Mr. B Natural entertainingly answers the call of Buzz, a shy, reticent teen-ager and for twenty-six minutes and forty seconds explains how music and playing a musical instrument will help develop posture, breathing, self-confidence, coordination and in general a young person's character. Mr. B gives both youthful and adult audiences ease to take instruction in the values of music. The Film is being made available by the Band Instrument Division of Conn through Conn dealers everywhere."

In captions for the productions photos included in the three-page essay, the title character is consistently referred to as "he", an indication that Conn intended Mr. B to be of the male gender. However, in an instance of reverse-gender casting similar to the casting of Mary Martin as Peter Pan ("Mary Martin syndrome" as Kevin Murphy said when writing about his experiences with the short film), the role was cast with an actress, Betty Luster, who had been a television musical variety star only a few years before.

== Plot ==
The action opens upon the musical staff in which Mr. B Natural lives. Mr. B addresses the audience directly, in an effort to appear welcoming, and explains what it means to be a spirit of music. Awaiting a person's call for help, Mr. B evinces sympathy and concern for lonely junior high student Buzz Turner.

Buzz shows an interest in music like the more popular kids at school, but is so shy that he makes excuses to not attend a dance, even when a girl directly invites him. Dejected, Buzz returns home and puts on a record. This magically summons Mr. B into the adolescent boy's bedroom, whereupon the pixie uses magic, music and dance to convince Buzz to take up playing the trumpet.

In visiting the music dealership, Buzz's parents are reassured by the salesman that buying a trumpet is "simply making a small investment in your son's lifetime personality." When Buzz mentions that he didn't care what make his new horn would be, he is reproached by Mr. B Natural, and is treated to a detailed description of the C. G. Conn factory and laboratories.

Through the gift of music and the help of his mysterious friend, Buzz finds the confidence and assertiveness he needs to try out for the school band, impress girls, and play solo at concerts and school dances.

== Cast ==
- Betty Luster as Mr. B Natural

Betty Luster performed on the operatic stage in the late 1940s, was a regular on the 1951 NBC television variety show Seven at Eleven, and in 1955 appeared on Broadway. Mr. B Natural was not quite Luster's last known performing role. In August–September 1957 she performed alongside Groucho Marx in Marx's own play "Time for Elizabeth" at the Andover (NJ) Grist Mill Playhouse and then in Iverton, CT.

- Bruce Podewell as Buzz Turner. "Buzz" is Podewell's own nickname, and he had appeared under that name on Watch Mr. Wizard in 1951. He was a professor of theater and dance at Tulane University for nearly 40 years, until his death in March 2013.
- James Andelin as Band instructor (uncredited)
- Lester Podewell as Mr. Turner (Buzz's father) (uncredited)
- Paul E. Richards

== Production ==
Mr. B Natural was produced by Chicago's Kling Film Productions, which prepared industrial films and commercials. The film's sponsor, C.G. Conn, was introducing its new line of "Connstellation" brass instruments in the mid-1950s, which may explain the emphasis on these instruments in the storyline.

Shooting took place in 1956, on 16mm in Technicolor, most of it presumably at Kling's huge Chicago facility, with "the largest sound stages outside of the [West] Coast.". Other scenes are at the school grounds of Waukegan Elementary School in Illinois and Miami Sr. High School in Florida were used for location shots. Footage of workers at a C.G. Conn plant also appears.

Betty Luster was in Chicago in the last months of 1956 as a featured dancer-singer in the revue "Hey Day" at the Palmer House's Empire Room, which would suggest that her segments in Mr. B Natural were filmed during this period.

=== Crew ===
- Phil Patton, director

Patton's only other known credit was for directing the American dubs and footage of the Soviet children's classic The Snow Queen in 1959. Patton joined Chicago's Kling Productions in February 1956, after seven years as producer of the children's television program "Super Circus" (broadcast nationally on ABC), noted for such live-animal acts as elephants, lions, and tigers.

- Marvin David, writer
- Bernie Saber, music
- David Savitt, cinematographer
- Arthur Ellis, editor

== Legacy ==
=== Mystery Science Theater 3000 ===
Rediscovery

In 1991, HBO sought content for its new network, Comedy Central, and employed "ephemeral film" expert Rick Prelinger to locate amusing vintage footage. Mr. B Natural was not held in Prelinger's collection, but was licensed for use in Mystery Science Theater 3000 (MST3K) from Streamline Film Archives, now F.I.L.M. Archives. F.I.L.M. Archives is the only known holder of this film print today, archived as reel #1133B.

Use

Mr. B Natural was featured on MST3K as part of episode #319, preceding the film War of the Colossal Beast, which first aired November 30, 1991. Trace Beaulieu cites this short as one of his favorites.

In MST3K's revisiting of the short, Joel Robinson and the bots mock Mr. B's gender ambiguity and seemingly sinister interest in Buzz. They also pick up on a candid comment of Mr. B Natural, "don't be too sure I wasn't in the Garden with Mr. and Mrs. Adam," making the connection that Adam and Eve's only companion in Eden mentioned in the Genesis story was the serpent. When Mr. B Natural starts a series of bizarre dances, Crow moans "Oh, my God, please say this isn't happening!" while Tom intones "Ladies and gentlemen, please accept our sincere apologies for all of this." Following the short, Joel moderates a mock-debate between Crow T. Robot and Tom Servo as to whether Mr. B Natural is a man or a woman.

Running joke

The short was later referenced many times during the show's run. Examples include:

- In Episode #420, The Human Duplicators, as a lithe woman walks down a stairway and across a room, Crow says in a higher pitched voice, "Knew your father, I did", a line uttered by Mr. B Natural.
- In Episode #421, Joel, to cheer him up after a particularly bad movie (Monster A-Go-Go), dressed Tom up as a "Happy King", quoting Mr. B and pronouncing it the same oddly chipper way the character did.
- In Episode #514, Teen-Age Strangler, as a character walks past several high school lockers, Crow declares nervously, "Mr. B Natural's in one of those lockers."
- During the short Design for Dreaming in Episode #524, Crow reacts to the main actress's perky dancing by declaring "It's a salute to Mr. B Natural!"
- In one scene in #703, Deathstalker and the Warriors from Hell, Deathstalker gingerly leaps out of the way of a sword, to which Crow exclaims, "I'm Mr. B Natural!"

Mr. B was recreated by Bridget Jones in the live broadcast "Turkey Day" host segments of episode #701T Night of the Blood Beast, on November 23, 1995. Jones's Mr. B has arrived on the show to celebrate Thanksgiving, but becomes the focus of the unwelcome advances of another guest, a drunken Jack Perkins, played by Jones' real-life husband Michael J. Nelson.

The short was revisited in 2023 when the show's characters, Kinga Forrester and Max, played by Felicia Day and Patton Oswalt are forced to watch it.

=== RiffTrax ===
In 2013, RiffTrax, a comedy website that features three of the stars of Mystery Science Theater 3000 (Michael J. Nelson, Bill Corbett, and Kevin Murphy), wrote and performed an all-new commentary track for Mr. B Natural. The resulting film with commentary track was released to some sponsors of their Kickstarter crowdfunding campaign. Unlike the truncated version used on MST3K, the one on RiffTrax is a nearly unedited 26 minutes, 7 seconds.

== See also ==
- A Case of Spring Fever
- Kitsch
- United States in the 1950s
