= Süleyman Demirel University =

Public university in Isparta, Turkey

- Type: Public
- Established: 1976 / 1992
- Affiliations: European University Association; Council of Higher Education (Turkey); International Association of Universities; Bologna Process
- Endowment: State: US$101 million (2010); Other: $48 million (2005); Total: approx. $149 million
- Rector: Prof. Dr. Mehmet SALTAN
- Faculty: 1796
- Undergraduates: 37054
- Postgraduates: 2103
- Location: Isparta, Turkey; 37.829°N 30.529°E
- Campus: Suburban
- Website: w3.sdu.edu.tr

University rankings

Regional – Overall
- QS Emerging Europe and Central Asia: 251-300 (2022)

Süleyman Demirel University (SDU) (Turkish: Süleyman Demirel Üniversitesi) is a public university located in Isparta, Turkey. Established in 1992, the university, with around 70.000 students, is the second largest academic institution in Turkey. SDU is known for its programs in agricultural research, medicine, engineering, and business sciences. The university (Institution Code: TR ISPARTA01) is approved by the Erasmus programme for participation and funding. SDU is a member of the European University Association.

In 2018, the university underwent an administrative restructuring, during which the faculties of Agriculture, Forestry, and Technology, as well as the Eğirdir Faculty of Fisheries, were transferred to Isparta University of Applied Sciences.

Thirteen academics from Süleyman Demirel University were recognized in the "World’s Most Influential Scientists List" published by Stanford University in collaboration with Elsevier.

== History ==
SDU was founded on 11 July 1992 in Isparta. The university is named after Süleyman Demirel. The faculty of Engineering and Architecture is the first faculty in the university which was formerly known as Isparta State Engineering and Architecture Academy founded in 1976.

== Academic structure ==
The academic structure of SDU contains fifteen faculties, twelve vocational high schools, two higher schools, and four graduate schools.

=== Faculties ===
The list of faculties in the university:

1. Faculty of Fine Arts
2. Faculty of Aquatic Products
3. Faculty of Humanities and Social Sciences
4. Faculty of Dentistry
5. Faculty of Theology
6. Faculty of Economic and Administrative Sciences
7. Faculty of Engineering and Natural Sciences
8. Faculty of Architecture
9. Faculty of Forestry
10. Faculty of Technical Education
11. Faculty of Medicine
12. Faculty of Agriculture
13. Faculty of Health Sciences
14. Faculty of Technological development
15. Faculty of Law
16. Faculty of Education

=== Rankings ===
Süleyman Demirel University ranks 10th in Turkey in the 2014-2015 URAP ranking. Additionally, U.S. News & World Report ranks Süleyman Demirel University 14th in the Best Global Universities in Turkey rankings. The QS World University Rankings recognized Süleyman Demirel University as one of the top universities in Turkey.

== Research ==
The SDU aims to be a research-oriented university, according to its strategic plan. 29 research and implementation centres are operating in scientific and technological areas and form the basis for the implementation of this strategic goal.

SDU's priority research areas cover environmental sciences, biotechnology, energy and technology sciences.

=== Research centers ===
- SDU Research Hospital
- SDU Rose Research Center
- Principles of Atatürk and History of the Turkish Revolution Research and Implementation Center
- Computer Sciences Research and Implementation Center
- Botanic Field and Herbarium Research and Implementation Center
- CAD/CAM Implementation Center
- Experimental and Observatory Student Research and Implementation Center
- Earthquake and Geotechnics Research and Implementation Center
- Research and Implementation Center for Geothermal Energy
- Groundwater and Mineral Resources Research and Implementation Center
- Cancer Early Diagnosis Center
- Women Studies Research and Implementation Center
- Fashion Design & Ready-made Clothes Research and Implementation Center
- Music Culture Research and Implementation Center
- Pumice Research and Implementation Center
- Radio TV Research and Implementation Center
- Ceramics Research and Implementation Center
- Center for Strategic Research
- Turkish Language Research and Implementation Center
- Remote Sensing Research and Implementation Center
- Renewable Energy Resources Center for Research and Application
- Research and Implementation Hotels
- Continuous Education Research and Implementation Center
- EU Documentation Research and Implementation Center
- Agricultural Research and Implementation Center
- Technological Materials Research and Development and Calibration Center

== Campus ==
The SDU's main campus is located in, and occupies most of, the Çünür suburb of Isparta. The university has 300000 square meters built area in 10000 decare land. Most of the university's centers and faculties are on campus.

=== Prof. Dr. Hassan Gürbüz Information Centre ===
Information centre (IC) occupies 8000 square meters and has 950-seat capacity.

IC academic collection consists of 100000 books, 64500 e-books, 1310 journal subscriptions, 39000 e-journal subscriptions, 2500 CD-DVDs and 53 online databases.

=== Practice and research hospital ===
The 400-bed capacity SDU Research Hospital was established on 1 November 2000.

=== Lakes District Technocity ===
The technocity is a science park project. It is located on both east and west campuses.

Lakes District Technocity is a member of International Association of Science Parks.

== Student life ==
The city of Isparta offers somewhat limited entertainment options, so students spend their free time participating in on-campus activities and in neighbor city Antalya.

Süleyman Demirel University's on-campus housing includes several dormitories.

Every year, the university hosts a spring festival in May and an international jazz festival in December.

=== Scholarships and financial support ===
SDU offers several scholarships to students. 750 students receive food scholarship annually from the university. In addition to that, 219 students receive cash scholarship by the General Directorate of Credits and Dormitories.

There is a university-run part-time work system which offers four hours of work per week during academic semesters to eligible students.

=== Sports and recreation ===
The main campus has a sports hall, a football pitch, two artificial grass football pitches, a beach volleyball court, six tennis courts (four open and two indoor), mini golf fields, an athletics track, a running track, a fitness centre and two open basketball courts.

The 2500-seat sport hall's facilities include an aerobics and steps hall, a gymnastics hall, a squash court, an artificial climbing wall, individual sports halls, a cafeteria, a university merchandise store, and massage and sauna rooms.

SDU has a horse riding club with free membership for students.

=== Broadcasting ===
SDU has two student broadcasting operations: SDU Radio and ScienceTV. SDU Radio Television Research and Implementation Center oversees the operations of student broadcasting.

=== Student clubs ===
SDU has 64 student clubs, including: Rock Community, Industrial and Quality Club, Aviation Club, Turkish Folklore Club, Theatre Club, Radio Club, Mountaineering and Orienteering Club, Chess and Bridge Club, Skiing Club, Technology Club, Diving Club, Dance Club, Economics and Management Club, Book Club, Biology and Environment Club.

== Honorary doctorates ==
Honorary doctorates from Süleyman Demirel University include:

- Filiz Akın, actress
- Heydar Aliyev, former president of Azerbaijan
- Jerzy Buzek, former prime minister of Poland
- Rauf Denktaş, first president of Turkish Republic of Northern Cyprus
- Fatma Girik, actress
- Herman Braun-Vega, painter
- Hülya Koçyiğit, actress
- Justin A. McCarthy, U.S. historian
- İsmet Sezgin, former speaker of the Turkish parliament
- Türkan Şoray, actress
- Şarık Tara, businessman in construction
- Selçuk Yaşar, businessman in food industry
- Andrew Mango, author, historian
- Pier Ugo Calzolari, engineer

== Notable faculty members ==
- Murat Ali Dulupçu

== Partner universities ==
- Azerbaijan State University, Azerbaijan
- University of Ghent, Belgium
- Sofia University, Bulgaria
- Tianjin Polytechnic University, China
- Helsinki University, Finland
- Tampere University of Technology, Finland
- Grenoble École de Management, France
- Paris-Sud 11 University, France
- Technische Universität Berlin, Germany
- Free University of Berlin, Germany
- University of L'Aquila, Italy
- University of Ferrara, Italy
- University of Florence, Italy
- University of Parma, Italy
- University of Pisa, Italy
- Erasmus University Rotterdam, Netherlands
- Wageningen University, Netherlands
- University of Łódź, Poland
- University of Warsaw, Poland
- University of Ljubljana, Slovenia
- University of Barcelona, Spain
- University of Salamanca, Spain
- University of Valencia, Spain
- Chien Hsin University of Science and Technology, Taiwan
- Iowa State University, United States
- Ohio State University, United States

== See also ==
- Balkan Universities Network
- List of forestry universities and colleges
- Journal of Natural and Applied Sciences
