= Journal of Natural and Applied Sciences =

- Discipline: Applied Sciences, Natural Sciences
- Language: English, Turkish
- Edited by: Ahmet YÜCESAN and Yasin TUNCER (Süleyman Demirel University)

Publication details
- History: 1995-present
- Publisher: SDU Press (Turkey)
- Frequency: Triannual

Standard abbreviations
- ISO 4: J. Nat. Appl. Sci.

Indexing
- ISSN: 1300-7688
- OCLC no.: 193826915

Links
- Journal homepage

Journal of Natural and Applied Sciences (Turkish: Süleyman Demirel Üniversitesi Fen Bilimleri Enstitüsü dergisi) is a triannual peer-reviewed academic journal affiliated with the SDU Institute of Natural and Applied Sciences. The journal was founded in 1995.

The journal is abstracted in Zentralblatt MATH, Chemical Abstract, CAB Abstract and EBSCO Host.
