= Lustre =

Lustre or Luster may refer to:

== Places ==
- Luster Municipality, a municipality in Vestland county, Norway
  - Luster (village), a village within Luster Municipality in Vestland county, Norway
- Lustre, Montana, an unincorporated community in the United States

== Entertainment ==
- Luster (film), a 2002 movie by Everett Lewis
- Lustre (band), American power pop band
- Lustre (musical project), Swedish black metal artist Henrik Sunding
- Luster (album), 2025 album by Maria Somerville
- Lustre (Ed Harcourt album), 2010
- Lustre (Claire Voyant album), 2009
- Luster (novel), a 2020 novel by Raven Leilani

== Software ==
- Lustre (file system), a Free Software distributed file system
- Lustre (programming language), a synchronous programming language
- Lustre, a color grading software developed by Autodesk Media and Entertainment

== Other uses ==
- Luster (surname)
- Nadine Lustre (born 1993), Filipina actress and singer
- Lustre (mineralogy), a description of the way light interacts with the surface of a crystal, rock or mineral
- Lustre prints, a photograph or artwork with a finish between glossy and matte
- USS Luster (IX-82), a yacht which served in the United States Navy as a patrol boat during World War II
- Operation Lustre, an Allied action in Greece in 1941 during World War II
- Lustre (treaty), a secret treaty between France and members of the UKUSA Agreement for cooperation in signals intelligence
- Luster (textiles), a property of textiles make them appearing bright, shiny and lustrous
- Lustre, English-language form of Latin lustrum – a period of 5 years
- Lustre, a chandelier or a glass pendant used in chandelier

== See also ==
- Lusterware, ceramics with lustre glazes
- Lustral (disambiguation)
