= Film Archives, Inc. =

Film Archives, Inc. or F.I.L.M. Archives (Fast Images Lotsa Movies) is a stock footage company based in Valley Stream, New York.

It is believed to be one of the oldest independent footage companies and has supplied footage to feature films, television, industrial, commercial, and web footage users.

Footage from its library of mostly vintage films has been featured in The Daily Show with Jon Stewart, The Tonight Show Starring Jimmy Fallon, The Real Wolf of Wall Street, Hazardous History with Henry Winkler, Dark Side of the Cage and the feature films MADDEN, A LONG WINTER and MUSK

== History ==
Film Archives was founded in 1986 by Mark Trost and Rick Scheckman, who had been collecting 16mm films as a hobby throughout the 1960s and 1970s, an era before the advent of home VCRs. When Trost was contacted by the producers of the ABC News series Our World with Linda Ellerbee for use of a clip from the 1938 Lone Ranger serial, the company notified other TV producers of their collection. Producers of Geraldo, Inside Edition and the Comedy Channel (precursor to Comedy Central) soon began incorporating clips from the company's collection into their programs.

Company's major claim to television fame is being the source of David Letterman's favorite clip, Monkey Washes the Cat, which has since been replaced by a sneezing monkey (not provided by FILM Archives). The clip was featured as the "Moment of Zen" accompanying Jon Stewart's February 10 announcement that he would be retiring from The Daily Show. In addition, they licensed the rare short Mr. B Natural for use in Mystery Science Theater 3000 (MST3K). F.I.L.M. Archives is the only known holder of this film print today, archived as reel #1133B.

According to company records, the top five footage requests are: 1. Elvis Presley 2. Marilyn Monroe 3. John F. Kennedy 4. 1950s suburbia 5. World War II

== Select client list ==
Television series:

- America In Color
- American Horror Story: 1984
- American Masters
- Anthony Bourdain: Parts Unknown
- CBS Evening News
- CBS Sunday Morning
- The Colbert Report
- The Daily Show with Jon Stewart
- The Deuce
- Documentary Now!
- The Dr. Oz Show
- The 80s: The Decade That Made Us
- Entertainment Tonight
- Fast N' Loud
- Foo Fighters: Sonic Highways
- Going Clear: Scientology, Hollywood and the Prison of Belief
- The Goldbergs
- Good Morning America
- Inside Edition
- Key & Peele
- Kurt Cobain: Montage of Heck
- Late Show with David Letterman
- Mad Men
- Makers: Women Who Make America
- McMillions
- The Mentalist
- The Middle
- MythBusters
- O.J.: Made in America
- Raising Hope
- Saturday Night Live
- Sinatra: All or Nothing at All
- South Park
- Succession
- The Tonight Show Starring Jimmy Fallon
- Transparent
- Tyrant

Films:

- The Age of Adaline
- Argo
- Battle of the Sexes
- Belushi
- Bridge of Spies
- Bowling for Columbine
- Capturing the Friedmans
- Chapter 27
- Charlie Wilson's War
- Chicago
- Couples Retreat
- Deli Man
- Dolemite Is My Name
- Dreamgirls
- Fahrenheit 9/11
- 42
- The Founder
- Foxcatcher
- Geostorm
- Ghost Ship
- Hollywoodland
- I'm Your Woman
- An Inconvenient Truth
- Pawn Sacrifice
- San Andreas
- Supermensch: The Legend of Shep Gordon
- Tab Hunter Confidential
- Tarnation
- Think Like A Man Too
- 13th
- ‘’Trial of the Chicago 7’’
- Uncle Drew
- Watchmen
- What Happened, Miss Simone?
- Where's My Roy Cohn?
- World War Z
