= Isparta University of Applied Sciences =

Public university in Isparta, Turkey

- Isparta Uygulamalı Bilimler Üniversitesi
- Type: Public
- Established: May 18, 2018
- Rector: Prof. Dr. Yılmaz Çatal
- Location: Isparta, Turkey; 37.8335°N 30.5256°E
- Website: isparta.edu.tr

Isparta University of Applied Sciences (Turkish: Isparta Uygulamalı Bilimler Üniversitesi) is a public university in Isparta, Turkey. It was established on May 18, 2018.

== History ==
The university was established in 2018 by Law No. 7141. It was formed by separating several faculties and vocational schools from Süleyman Demirel University. The university focuses on agricultural sciences and forestry.
