= Laster =

Laster may refer to:

- Laster (surname)
- Laster (band), a Dutch metal band
- Das Laster, a 1915 German film
- Laster, a Transformer in the 1989 anime series Transformers: Victory
