= Lustral (disambiguation) =

Lustral may refer to:

- Sertraline (also known as "Lustral"), an antidepressant
- Lustral (band), a British electronic music duo
- "Lustral", a song by BT from _, 2016
- Lustral water

== See also ==
- Lustre (disambiguation)
- Lustrum
- Water of lustration, or lustral water, biblical term
