= Chivinar =

Volcano in northwest Argentina

Coordinates: 24°14′S 67°27′W

Chivinar is a 5,125 metres (16,814 ft) high Late Miocene volcano in Northwest Argentina. The volcano is noted for having erupted rhyolites containing topaz in its early stage of evolution, the only known occurrence of such in South America. This topaz did form during the crystallization of the magma in a fluorine-rich phase thereof at low temperatures and pressures. The topazes reach sizes of 8 centimetres (3.1 in). The topaz bearing rocks cover a surface area of 8 by 4 kilometres (5.0 mi × 2.5 mi) that is interrupted by a lava flow. Much older granitoid bodies also lie in the area and are 502–425 million years old.

The volcano has been constructed in three main phases. First, a set of rhyolite lava domes and plugs was erupted and formed a platform beneath the edifice without evidence of explosive activity or caldera formation. This unit appears on the northern and western flanks of the volcano between 3,500–4,000 metres (11,500–13,100 ft) and form about one third of the total volume, with the domes ranging 0.3–1 kilometre (0.19–0.62 mi) in width and 250 metres (820 ft) in height. They are heavily hydrothermally altered and deformed. A gap during which tectonic and climatic degradation of the earlier domes occurred separates this stage from the next. Subsequently, destruction of domes during eruptions generated a unit consisting of coarse dacite in pumice and breccia form spreading out from the centre. On top of this unit, an andesitic cone formed, dated at 9 mya. Some aphyric phenobasalts cover surfaces of the second unit.

The early phase rhyolites contain alkali feldspar (49±2% volume), plagioclase containing sodium (14±3% volume) and quartz (36±2% volume). A number of gas rich inclusions and accessory minerals are also present, including topaz, xenotime and zircon. Hydrothermally altered rhyolites contain rutile and secondary silicates in veins. All products are porphyritic, including the late andesites which contain phenocrysts of hornblende and plagioclase with smaller amounts of biotite, clinopyroxene, iron oxides and orthopyroxene. Based on crystal analysis, the rhyolites were stored at pressures of 300–400 megapascals (44,000–58,000 psi) and temperatures of 720–730 °C (1,328–1,346 °F).

The volcano is situated at the point where the main volcanic arc intersects the Calama–Olacapato–El Toro lineament, a fault zone that has formed over fifteen million years a number of volcanic structures including lava domes, stratovolcanoes and monogenetic scoria cones. This fault system has imparted the Chivinar centre an extensional characteristic. The Chivinar centre itself formed over an Eocene-Miocene basement containing evaporites and sediments.
