= Murat Ali Dulupçu =

Turkish economist

- Born: May 24, 1971 (age 55); Turkey

Academic background
- Education: Istanbul University; Süleyman Demirel University; University of Birmingham

Academic work
- Discipline: Development economics Regional Science
- Institutions: Süleyman Demirel University
- Awards: Turkish Academy of Sciences Publication Support Award (2005); TUBITAK Publication Support Award (2007)

Murat Ali Dulupçu (born May 24, 1971) is a Turkish economist at the Süleyman Demirel University.

== Biography ==
Murat Ali Dulupcu attended the Isparta Anatolian High School in Isparta. He graduated from Istanbul University in 1989 with a Bachelor of Arts in Economics and from Suleyman Demirel University in 1995 with an M.A. in Economics. He completed his Ph.D. in Regional Science at Kütahya Dumlupınar University.

Dulupcu is a member of board of directors at Lakes District Technocity. He is a partner and representative of Suleyman Demirel University in EURODITE project. He is also a partner in EUROLAB project. He was the reporter for 9th Development Plan (2007–2013) of Turkey.

== Publications ==
- Dulupçu, M.(2005) "Regionalization for Turkey: An Illusion or a cure?", European Urban and Regional Studies, vol. 13: pp. 280 – 281
- Dulupçu, M.(2006) "Turkey and the EU, A Glittering Prize or a Millstone?", European Urban and Regional Studies, vol. 12: pp. 99 – 115
- Dulupçu, M.(2002). "Accommodating Turkey in New Regionalism" Centre for Regional and Urban Studies, University of Birmingham Press ISBN 0-7044-2233-6
