= Betty Luster =

American actress (1922 - 2011)

- Born: April 27, 1922
- Died: May 25, 2011 (aged 89)
- Other name: Betty L. Prentis
- Years active: 1938–1956

Betty Luster (April 27, 1922 – May 25, 2011) was an American television actress, singer, and dancer, whose career was active in the 1940s and 1950s. The role for which she is best remembered today was at one time her most obscure: her portrayal of Mr. B Natural in the short film of the same name, made famous after its inclusion in a 1991 episode of Mystery Science Theater 3000.

== Career ==
Betty Luster was the winner of the first Miss Lake Mohawk contest in 1937.

Her earliest known stage performances were as a showgirl with the Dorchester Hale dance troupe in London in October 1938. She made a series of appearances on BBC television in 1939.

Later she was a dancing girl in the 1940 Broadway production of Irving Berlin's Louisiana Purchase. and she was a chorus girl at the Beachcomber in Miami Beach in 1946 and/or 1947. In the late 1940s, she performed on the operatic stage in Philadelphia.

Luster served as co-hostess of the 1950 CBS game show Sing It Again, a progenitor to Name That Tune, wherein contestants would attempt to identify songs from just a few notes. Her other television appearance was as a regular on the 1951 NBC variety show Seven at Eleven.

Luster again appeared on Broadway as "Sebena" in a production of The Wayward Saint. The show ran at the Cort Theatre from February 17 to March 6, 1955.

In 1957, following her filming of Mr. B Natural in Chicago, she took a non-performing position on the production staff for CBS-TV's Name That Tune.

Mr. B Natural was not quite Luster's last-known performing role. In August–September 1957 she performed alongside Groucho Marx in the play Time for Elizabeth at the Andover (NJ) Grist Mill Playhouse and then in Iverton, CT. Luster retired from performing after her marriage to Edmund Astley "Ned" Prentis, III (b. New York City, September 12, 1923, d. Delray, FL, August 11, 1997) and she "joined him in becoming an expert in big-game fishing, big-game hunting and world-class croquet."

== Mr. B Natural ==
In 1956, Luster took the title role in a film sponsored by the musical instrument manufacturer C.G. Conn to promote to schoolchildren an interest in music. Mr. B Natural told the story of a "hep pixie" who helps junior high school student Buzz Turner awaken the "spirit of music" inside of him through the purchase of and practice on a Conn brand trumpet.

The short remained an obscure classroom reel until 1991, when it was brought to the attention of HBO, which was seeking content for its new cable network, Comedy Central. Mr. B Natural was licensed for use by Best Brains' movie-spoofing vehicle Mystery Science Theater 3000, and was broadcast nationally on November 30, 1991, preceding the feature War of the Colossal Beast. Due to this exposure, the short and the Mr. B Natural character have become recognized as kitsch icons.
