= Hanover Insurance =

Insurance company based in Worcester

The Hanover Insurance Group, Inc.
- Type: Public company
- Traded as: NYSE: THG; S&P 400 Component
- Industry: Insurance
- Founded: 1852
- Headquarters: Worcester, Massachusetts, United States
- Key people: John Roche (President and Chief Executive Officer)
- Products: Casualty insurance, Property insurance
- Number of employees: 6500 (2022)
- Website: www.hanover.com

The Hanover Insurance Group, Inc. is an insurance company based in Worcester, Massachusetts. It was the original name of a property-liability insurance firm established in 1852, and it remained a publicly traded company under that name until the early 1990s, when it changed its name to Allmerica Property & Casualty Companies.

In 1996 it spun off Allmerica Financial Corporation as a property and casualty insurance and financial services holding company, which then bought out the original firm, and grew to become one of the 500 largest publicly traded companies of the United States.

== History ==
=== The Hanover Insurance Group, Inc. ===
The Hanover Insurance Group was established in 1852 near Hanover Square in Manhattan in New York City. It paid a cash dividend to shareholders every year since 1853.

Though remaining a relatively small company over the next 125 years, Hanover's common stock price multiplied between 1971 and 1983 by over 23 times from its low point in the decade to its eventual peak. During the end of that period, in 1981, it split its shares three-for-two. The stock was traded publicly on the Over the Counter (OTC) exchange, now called the NASDAQ.

The rapid growth of the company continued into the mid-1980s, and in 1984 it split again, two-for-one, and by 1985 nearly doubled in price once more, trading then at a high price/earnings ratio of 61. At that time the company was debt-free, and carried a book value of nearly US$330 million. However, by then the company's earnings had fallen to about a third of what they had been in the early 1980s.

In 1987, the company split its stock two-for-one again, and was yet again on its way to another double in price, even as its PE ratio dropped back down to a bargain five times earnings. Those earnings had grown to nearly US$100 million, more than double what the company had earned at the prior peak of 1981. Book value by 1987 stood at US$550 million.

However, by the early 1990s recession, Hanover's earnings had declined once more, to about US$50 million.

=== Allmerica Property & Casualty Cos ===
By 1994, Hanover Insurance had changed its name to Allmerica Property & Casualty Companies, Inc. It moved from the NASDAQ to the New York Stock Exchange, where it traded publicly under the new symbol, APY.

In summer 1995 the stock price climbed above its 1993 peak high, as the economy came out of its soft landing, and PE ratios began their historic late 1990s ascent.

=== Allmerica Financial ===
In late 1995, the company spun off Allmerica Financial Corporation, with US$200 million long-term debt assigned to that company, as a new property and casualty insurance and financial services holding company. It held a diversified group of insurance and financial services companies with total assets of $19 billion. Allmerica Financial products included insurance and retirement savings accounts and group benefit programs, mostly variable annuity and variable life products. That company in turn owned about a majority 60% of the original entity, Allmerica Properties & Casualty Companies. By year end 1995 the new independent holding company (AFC) had a book value of over US$1.4 billion, nearly identical in size to its debt-free predecessor, which remained a majority-owned also a publicly traded subsidiary of AFC.

On October 11, 1995, Allmerica Financial Corporation began to trade on the NYSE, under the new symbol AFC. The initial offering price was $21.00.

By 1997, Allmerica Property & Casualty Companies was among the top 30 property and casualty insurers in the United States, based on net written premiums. By then its regional focus included Michigan as well as its traditional Northeast territory.

In 1997 Allmerica Property & Casualty Companies, Inc. was acquired by Allmerica Financial Corporation (AFC). The surviving company, AFC, would acquire the 40.5% of Allmerica P&C that it did not already own, for approximately US$800 million. The stock of Allmerica Property & Casualty Companies then ceased to trade, and its old ticker symbol APY was ultimately taken over on the AMEX exchange by Aspyra Inc., a microcap stock with US$20 million market capitalization.

=== The Hanover Insurance Group ===
On December 1, 2005, Allmerica Financial Corporation changed its name to The Hanover Insurance Group, Inc. and is the parent company of two divisions, Hanover Insurance and Citizens Insurance. It publicly trades under its new ticker symbol since that time. Those companies serve customers with auto, home and business insurance.

The Variable Life and Variable Annuity insurance businesses of Allmerica Financial Corporation became CommonWealth Annuity and Life Insurance Company, a Goldman Sachs Company. In January 2009, CommonWealth Annuity and Life Insurance Company acquired First Allmerica Life Insurance Company (FAFLIC) from The Hanover Group. In 2008, Hanover acquired AIX Group. In 2011, it acquired Chaucer Holdings.

In August 2020, The Hanover Insurance Group dropped the malpractice insurance of Mark S. Zaid, the lawyer for the whistleblower in the Trump-Ukraine scandal. Hanover said it had reviewed Zaid's website and discovered that his law firm practiced whistleblower law. Zaid said that Hanover's action served to protect those who wish to silence whistleblowers.
