= Robert Last =

Robert Last may refer to:

- Robert L. Last, biologist and chemist
- Robert Last (drummer) (1923–1986), German musician
- Robert Last (trade unionist) (1829–1898), British union leader
