= Chaucer Group =

Insurance company

- Company type: Private company
- Industry: Reinsurance
- Founded: 1987
- Founders: Bob Laslett
- Headquarters: London
- Key people: Richard Milner (CEO)
- Website: www.chaucergroup.com

Chaucer Group is an international specialty insurance and reinsurance group. It is headquartered in London, with offices overseas.

== History ==
The company was established by Bob Laslett in 1987. It was subsequently listed on the London Stock Exchange. It was then acquired by Hanover Insurance for £313 million in April 2011. It was the subject of a management buyout supported by Growth Capital Partners in February 2014.

Chaucer was acquired by China Reinsurance (Group) Corporation (China Re) for $950m (£766m) in 2018.
