= Giacomo Calzolari =

Italian economist and academic

- Born: August 5, 1969 (age 57)
- Occupation: Professor of Economics
- Title: Professor of Economics

Academic background
- Education: University of Bologna, University of Toulouse
- Thesis: Essays on Information Economics (2001)
- Website: https://sites.google.com/view/giacomo-calzolari

Giacomo Calzolari (August 5, 1969) is an economist and Professor of Economics at the European University Institute. His research focuses on competition policy, artificial intelligence, economics of regulation, industrial organization, banking regulation and supervision and the economics of incentives.

== Academic career ==
Calzolari studied economics at the University of Bologna where he received both his B.A. and doctorate. In 1998, he received a Master in Advanced Economics at the University of Toulouse, where he also received his Ph.D. in 2001. From 2000 to 2018 he was a professor of economics at the University of Bologna. During this time, he was also a visiting professor at Boston University from 2013-2014 and visiting professor at Shanghai University of Finance and Economics in November 2015. In 2018, he joined the European University Institute as a professor in the Department of Economics.

Calzolari is a research fellow at the Centre for Economic Policy Research (CEPR). He has received the Young Economist Award of the European Economic Association and in 2014 received, with Vincenzo Denicolò, the Best paper award by the Association of Competition Economics for their paper “Competition with Exclusive Contracts and Market-Share Discounts”.

He is the main editor of the International Journal of Industrial Organization, co-editor of European Economy – Banks, regulation, and the real sector, and former editor of Labour: Review of labour economics and industrial relations. Calzolari has published in top international journals such as American Economic Review, RAND Journal of Economics, International Economic Review, Games and Economic Behavior, Journal of Financial Intermediation, Review of Financial Studies, and Journal of Economic Theory.

He is member of the executive committee of the European Association of Industrial Economics, the Association of Competition Economics and the Economic Advisory Group on Competition Policy of the European Commission.

He speaks English, Italian, and French.

== Selected publications ==
- Calvano, Emilio, Calzolari, Giacomo, Denicolò, Vincenzo, Pastorello, Sergio. Artificial Intelligence, Algorithmic Pricing and Collusion, American Economic Review, forthcoming 2020.
- Calzolari, Giacomo, Denicolò, Vincenzo. Exclusive contracts and market dominance, American Economic Review, 2015, Vol.105 No. 11, pp. 3321–3351
- Calzolari, Giacomo, Vincenzo Denicolò. Competition with Exclusive Contracts and Market-Share Discounts. American Economic Review, 2013, Vol. 103, No. 6, pp. 2384–2411.
- Calzolari, Giacomo, Colliard, Jean-Edouard, Loranth, Gyongyi, Multinational banks and supranational supervision, The Review of Financial Studies, 2019, Vol. 32, No. 8, pp. 2997–3035
- Calzolari, Giacomo, Pavan, Alessandro. On the Optimality of Privacy in Sequential Contracting, Journal of Economic Theory, 2006, Vol. 130, No. 1, pp. 168–204
