= SDU Research Hospital =

Süleyman Demirel University Research Hospital

Geography
- Location: Isparta, Mediterranean Region, Turkey, Turkey
- Coordinates: 37.827560°N 30.540201°E

Organisation
- Type: Research and teaching
- Affiliated university: Süleyman Demirel University

Services
- Emergency department: Yes
- Beds: 400

History
- Opened: 1994

Links
- Website: sablon.sdu.edu.tr/hastane/index_en.php
- Lists: Hospitals in Turkey

The Süleyman Demirel University Research Hospital (SDU Research Hospital) is a research and teaching hospital located on the Süleyman Demirel University campus.

The hospital was founded in 1994 and transferred to its current building in 2000. The new building cost 37148000 USD. The SDU research hospital is a part of the Suleyman Demirel Hospital Network.
