= Umberto Calzolari =

Italian baseball player (1938–2018)

- Born: 4 June 1938; Bologna, Italy
- Died: 29 July 2018 (aged 80); Bologna, Italy
- Batted: Right Threw: Right

Serie A1 debut
- 1958, for the ACLI Bologna

Last appearance
- 1976, for the Fortitudo Bologna

Serie A statistics (through 1976)
- Batting average: .292
- Home runs: 32
- Runs batted in: 305
- Win–loss record: 152–59
- Earned run average: 2.16
- Saves: 4

Teams
- ACLI Bologna (1958–1963); Fortitudo Bologna (1963–1978)

Career highlights and awards
- 3× Italian Baseball Champion (1969, 1972, 1974); 1× Cup of Champions Winner (1973); No. 8 Retired by Fortitudo Bologna; Italian Baseball Hall of Fame (2014); Golden Diamond Award (1982)

Umberto Calzolari (4 June 1938 – 29 July 2018) was an Italian baseball player.

== Biography ==
Nicknamed "Professor", Calzolari played in ACLI Bologna from 1958 to 1963, when the team merged into Fortitudo Bologna. With Fortitudo Bologna he won three championships – in 1969, in 1972 and in 1974 – and a European Champion Clubs' Cup in 1973.

Fortitudo Bologna retired his number (8), and, in 1982, La Fibs awarded him the Golden Diamond for his career.

In 1993 with Alfredo Meli he founded the AIBxC (Italian Baseball Association for the Blind).

In 2014 he was included in the Italian Hall of Fame of baseball and softball as a coach.

He died in 2018 at the age of 80.
