= Lauter (surname) =

Lauter is a surname. Notable people with the surname include:

- Ants Lauter (1894–1973), Estonian actor
- Ed Lauter (1938–2013), American actor
- Estée Lauder (person) (1906–2004; originally Lauter), American businesswoman
- Harry Lauter (1914–1990), American actor
- Kristin Lauter (born 1969), American mathematician and cryptographer
- Margarete Lauter (1925–2004), German art dealer
- Matt Lauter (born 2002), American football player
- Rolf Lauter (born 1952), German art historian and curator
