= Leo Luster =

Austrian Holocaust survivor (1927–2017)

- Born: May 3, 1927; Vienna, Austria
- Died: January, 2017; Israel

Leo Luster (1927–2017) was an Austrian Holocaust survivor. He was taken to Theresienstadt Ghetto in 1942 and deported to Auschwitz concentration camp in 1944. After the Holocaust, Luster moved to Israel and served on the Central Council of Jews from Austria in Israel.

== Early life ==
Leo Luster was born to a Jewish family from Vienna. His parents were Moshe Luster (born 1891 in Jarosław) and Golda. They were married in 1920 and settled in Leopoldstadt, the second district of Vienna. Leo had at least one older sister, Helene. He went to school at Malzgasse. After the occupation of Austria by Nazi Germany, his father lost his job and the apartment in Schreygasse where the family lived. Luster had his bar mitzvah in 1940.

== Holocaust ==
On October 1, 1942 Luster and his parents were deported to Theresienstadt concentration camp. On September 29, 1944 he and his father were deported to Auschwitz concentration camp. His father was murdered by the Nazi regime. Luster was sent on a death march, but survived. He was liberated by the Red Army. During his stay at a camp for displaced persons he helped many of the other inmates.

== Later life ==
Luster's mother and sister survived. In 1949, he and his mother emigrated to Israel. He took a job as driver for the Austrian ambassador to Israel. Marrying a woman named Shoshana, he had two children — Nava and Moshe — and three grandchildren. He was elected board member of the Central Council of Jews from Austria in Israel.

After his retirement, Luster continued to help Jews from Austria with their pensions and financial support for their care. He worked closely with Gideon Eckhaus, another Jew from Austria who had come to Palestine in 1939. They ran a club for retired Jews from Austria. During his visit to Israel, Austrian chancellor Alfred Gusenbauer came to see Luster and Eckhaus. In 2003 Luster visited Vienna.

The National Fund of the Republic of Austria for the Victims of National Socialism was looking to locate Holocaust survivors in order to provide them with compensation. Luster was of great help to Hannah Lessing, its secretary general. Shortly before his death he donated three of his manuscripts to the National Fund. They are available on the Fund website.

- Driven out of Theresenstadt ....
- Night shift
- Free again.

== Recognition ==
- 2002 Decoration of Merit in Gold of the Republic of Austria
