= Cordonnier =

Cordonnier is a French-language occupational surname literally meaning "shoemaker" (or, less accurately, "cobbler"). From Old Fr. cordouanier (cordonnier), a cordwainer, a worker in Cuir de Cordoue ("Cordovan leather"), literally meaning "leather from Córdoba"

The surname may refer to:

- Alphonse-Amédée Cordonnier (1848–1930), French sculptor
- Antoine Cordonnier (1892–1918), French fighter pilot
- Eugène Cordonnier (1892–1967), French gymnast
- Julien Cordonnier (born 1980), French footballer
- Louis Marie Cordonnier (1854–1940), French architect
- Victor Cordonnier (1858–1936), French Army general

== See also ==
- Mount Cordonnier
