= Chaucer (surname) =

The surname Chaucer is thought to have one of the following derivations:

- The name Chaucer frequently occurs in the early Letter Books and in French language of the time it meant "shoemaker", which meaning is also recorded in the "Glossary of Anglo-Norman and Early English Words".
- From French 'chaussier', 'chaucier', a hosier.
- It may have arisen from 'chaufecire', 'chafewax', i.e. a clerk of the court of Chancery whose duty consisted in affixing seals to royal signature. However, Kern doubted this derivation, since the surname 'Chaucer' was too common.

The first two derivations are ultimately traced to Latin calcearium, "shoemaker".

The surname may refer to:

- Alice Chaucer, Duchess of Suffolk
- Chaucer Elliott (1879–1913), Canadian sportsman
- Geoffrey Chaucer, "Father of English literature"
- Thomas Chaucer (c. 1367 – 1434), Speaker of the English House of Commons
