= Pier Ugo Calzolari =

Italian electric engineer

Pier Ugo Calzolari (11 March 1938 – 11 October 2012) was an Italian engineer and professor of Applied Electronics at the University of Bologna since 1969.

Calzolari was born in Granarolo dell'Emilia. In addition to his other achievements, he was rector of the University of Bologna from the year 2000 to 2009. He died in Bologna, aged 74.
