= Sunrise Ruby =

25.59-carat ruby from Myanmar

The Sunrise Ruby

The Sunrise Ruby has been the world's most expensive ruby, most expensive coloured gemstone, and most expensive gemstone other than a diamond until the discovery of the Estrela de Fura.

Originally mined in Myanmar, its current name is derived from a poem of the same name, written by the 13th-century Sufi poet Rumi.

== Description ==
It is a 25.59-carat (5.1 g) Burmese "pigeon blood" ruby, mounted by Cartier and set between heptagonal diamonds weighing 2.47 carats (0.49 g) and 2.70 carats (0.54 g).

It is considered among the rarest of all gemstones. The Swiss Gemmological Institute has described it as "a unique treasure of nature" and praised its "well-proportioned cut, highly attractive colour and fine purity". The Gubelin Gem Lab in Lucerne stated that "such a combination of characteristics is very rare in Burmese rubies of this size." The global chairman of Sotheby's International Jewellery Division, David Bennett, when interviewed on the ruby, stated "during his 40 years in the industry, he has never before seen a ruby of this calibre". In a Gubelin grading report, it notes, "ruby is of Burmese origin" and that "its vivid but saturated color, poetically referred to as pigeon blood red, is due to a combination of well balanced trace elements in the stone, typical and characteristic for the finest rubies of Mogok." Gemstones of the same quality typically form in only small crystals, making this one an "extremely rare" gem.

== History ==
The ruby sold for a record US$30.42 million on 12 May 2015 at a Sotheby's auction in Geneva, Switzerland, to Heidi Horten. It was originally estimated to be worth between US$12 and 18 million prior to auction and bidding started at 11 million Swiss francs or US$11.8 million. Also known as lot 502 of the evening, bidding lasted approximately seven minutes with buyers via phone as the main source of bidding. The Sunrise Ruby greatly surpassed the previous record holder, the Graff ruby ring, which sold for US$8.6 million in November 2014. Its record-setting price has been attributed to the rapid increase in prices for coloured gemstones and public auctions, with figures often "rivaling the performance of the much-sought-after colored diamonds".

Following the death of Horten, the jewel was auctioned by Christie's in Geneva on 10 May 2023 for $14.7 million.

== See also ==
- List of rubies by size
- Black Prince's Ruby
- DeLong Star Ruby
- Liberty Bell Ruby
- Neelanjali Ruby
- Prince of Burma
- Rosser Reeves Ruby
- Timur Ruby
