= List of rubies by size =

Rubies by Size and Color

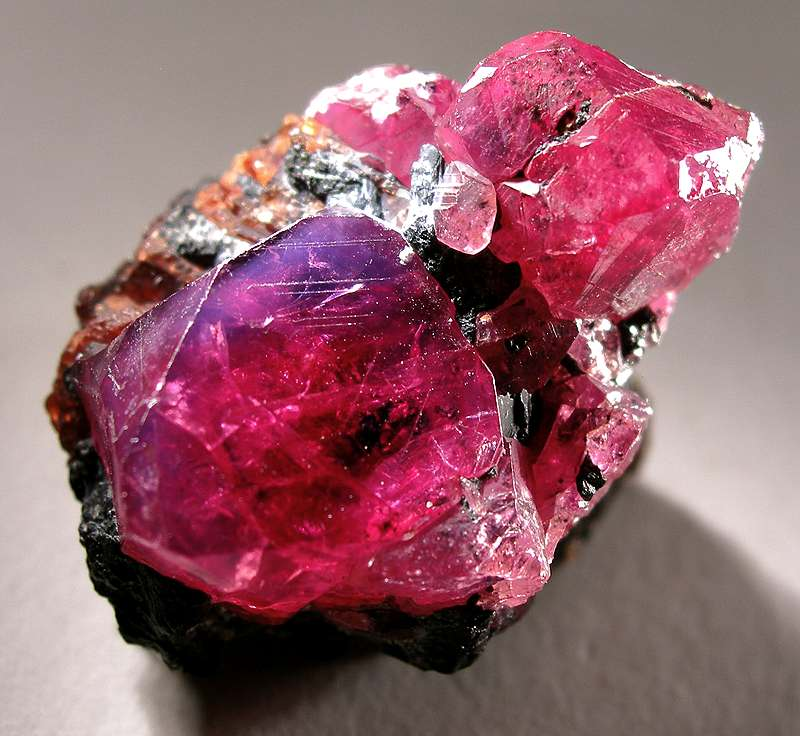
Natural ruby crystals from Winza, Tanzania

Rubies of various sizes have been found throughout the world. This is a list of rubies by size.

== Gemstone ==
A ruby is a pink to blood-red colored gemstone, a variety of the mineral corundum (aluminium oxide). Other varieties of gem-quality corundum are called sapphires. Ruby is one of the traditional cardinal gems, together with amethyst, sapphire, emerald, and diamond. The word ruby comes from ruber, Latin for red. The color of a ruby is due to the element chromium.

Some gemstones that are popularly or historically called rubies, such as the Black Prince's Ruby in the British Imperial State Crown, are actually spinels. These were once known as "Balas rubies".

The quality of a ruby is determined by its color, cut, and clarity, which, along with carat weight, affect its value. The brightest and most valuable shade of red called blood-red or pigeon blood, commands a large premium over other rubies of similar quality. After color follows clarity: similar to diamonds, a clear stone will command a premium, but a ruby without any needle-like rutile inclusions may indicate that the stone has been treated. Ruby is the traditional birthstone for July and is usually pinker than garnet, although some rhodolite garnets have a similar pinkish hue to most rubies. The world's most valuable ruby is the Sunrise Ruby.

== Notable rubies ==
Name	Origin	Date	Uncut size	Cut size	Location	Ref
Maharlika Star Ruby	India			10,820 carats (2,164 g)	Philippines	
Liberty Bell Ruby	Burma	1976 (Note: Cut on 1976)		8,500 carats (1,700 g)	Stolen and still missing	
Neelanjali Ruby				1,370 carats (274 g)		
Prince of Burma	Burma	1996	950 carats (190 g)			
Rosser Reeves Ruby	Sri Lanka		138.7 carats (27.74 g)		National Museum of Natural History	
DeLong Star Ruby	Burma	1930		100.32 carats (20.064 g)	American Museum of Natural History	
Garrard's Red Ruby	Burma			40.63 carats (8.126 g)		
Sunrise Ruby				25.59 carats (5.118 g)		
Carmen Lúcia Ruby	Burma	1930s		23.1 carats (4.62 g)	National Museum of Natural History	
Elizabeth Taylor Ruby				8.243 carats (1.6486 g)		
Seraphine Ruby	Burma	2022		5.03 carats	Gems of Note	
Estrela de Fura	Mozambique	2022		55.22 carats		

== See also ==
- List of individual gemstones

== Bibliography ==
Notes

References

- Australian Broadcasting Corporation (May 12, 2015). "Sunrise Ruby weighing 25.29 carats sells for $30 million at Sotheby's auction in Geneva". Australian Broadcasting Corporation.
- Barrish, Chris; O’Sullivan, Sean (February 21, 2014). "5 indicted in $4 million jewelry store robbery". USA Today.
- Bauer, Max (1968). Precious Stones: A Popular Account of Their Characters, Occurrence, and Applications, with an Introduction to Their Determination, for Mineralogists, Lapidaries, Jewellers, Etc. With an Appendix on Pearls and Coral, Volume 1. Dover Publications. ISBN 9780486219103. - Total pages: 627
- Edwards, Owen (February 1, 2005). "Romance And The Stone: A rare Burmese ruby memorializes a philanthropic woman". Smithsonian Magazine.
- McAndrew, Erin (December 14, 2011). "RESULTS: The Legendary Jewels, Evening Sale & Jewelry (Sessions II and III)". Christie's. Archived from the original on March 13, 2020.
- The New York Times (2014). New York Times The Times of the Sixties: The Culture, Politics, and Personalities that Shaped the Decade. Running Press. ISBN 9781603763660. - Total pages: 324
- Smithsonian Institution (2019). "Rosser Reeves Star Ruby". Smithsonian Institution.
- Sherman, Lauren (October 3, 2007). "World's Ultimate Jewels". Forbes.
