= Fura Gems =

FURA Gems
- Founded: 2017
- Founder: Dev Shetty
- Headquarters: Dubai
- Number of employees: 1650
- Website: www.furagems.com

FURA Gems is a private global mining company that produces colored gemstones: emeralds, rubies, and sapphires. Founded in 2017, FURA has its headquarters in Dubai, United Arab Emirates, and operates mining subsidiaries in Colombia, Mozambique, and Australia. In 2021, the company managed approximately six million carats of Mozambican rubies and 300,000 carats of Colombian emeralds. In 2022, FURA Gems unveiled the world's largest gem-quality ruby ever mined, which was sold by Sotheby's for $34.8 million in 2023.

== History ==
FURA Gems was established in 2017 by Dev Shetty with a focus on increasing the supply of ethically-sourced color gemstones with traceability of the mine origin to end-consumers. The company's name is derived from an ancient Colombian legend about Fura and Tena, two human figures created by the Muisca god Are.

In 4 years, FURA acquired all of its key mining assets, including the Coscuez Emerald mine in Colombia in 2018, seven ruby mining licenses in Montepuez, Mozambique in 2019, and the Great Northern Mining and Capricorn Sapphire mines in Queensland, Australia in 2020. In 2023, FURA announced the discovery of the largest gem-quality ruby named "Estrela de FURA" ("Star of FURA" in Portuguese), weighing 101 carats and mined from Mozambique. As of 2024, FURA holds nine ruby mining licenses in Mozambique, covering an area of 100 square kilometers.

== Gem auctions ==
FURA Gems conducts its gemstone sales through auctions, providing a platform for the trade of these precious stones. Typically, the company hosts a total of eight auctions each year, with six of them taking place in Bangkok and the remaining two in Bogotá.

In March 2021, the company conducted its first Colombian emerald auction, followed by auctions for the Mozambique ruby in September 2021 and the Australian sapphire in November 2021. In 2021, the Australian sapphires auction took place in Bangkok, displaying 900,000 carats of natural rough sapphire in rare colors. On June 8, 2023, Sotheby's "Magnificent Jewels" sale took place in New York. The largest gem-quality ruby, Estrela da FURA, was sold for $34.8 million, making it the largest and most expensive ruby ever to be auctioned. Sotheby's auction house officially declared Estrela de FURA the most valuable ruby ever offered for sale.

== Public activities ==
FURA has several community projects in Colombia, Mozambique, and Australia. A project in Mozambique included the construction of a primary school in Napula to support local education. The implementation of the FURA Training Academy allows its employees and members of the mining community to develop mining-related skills such as geology, gemology, and engineering. FURA Gems established an all-female wash plant at its Coscuez emerald project in Boyacá, Colombia. This initiative is the first for both the mining and gemstone industry. FURA Gems is focused on environmentally and socially responsible mining. The company implemented the use of blockchain technology developed by Gübelin Gem Lab and Everledger to maintain traceability for the ethical origins of gemstones it mines. FURA has implemented water management and waste recycling practices to protect the surrounding environment of its mines. The company undertakes reforestation and land reclamation following mining activities.

== Operations ==
FURA Gems operates as a global producer of colored gemstones, including emeralds, rubies, and sapphires, across South America, Africa, and Oceania. It is the first and only producer of these three categories of gemstones on three continents (South America, Africa, and Oceania). The company is headquartered in Dubai, United Arab Emirates and employs over 1,650 people across four continents. FURA holds ownership or majority stakes in mines located in Colombia (emeralds), Mozambique (rubies and emeralds), and Australia (sapphires).
