= Rosser Reeves Ruby =

138.7 carat star ruby

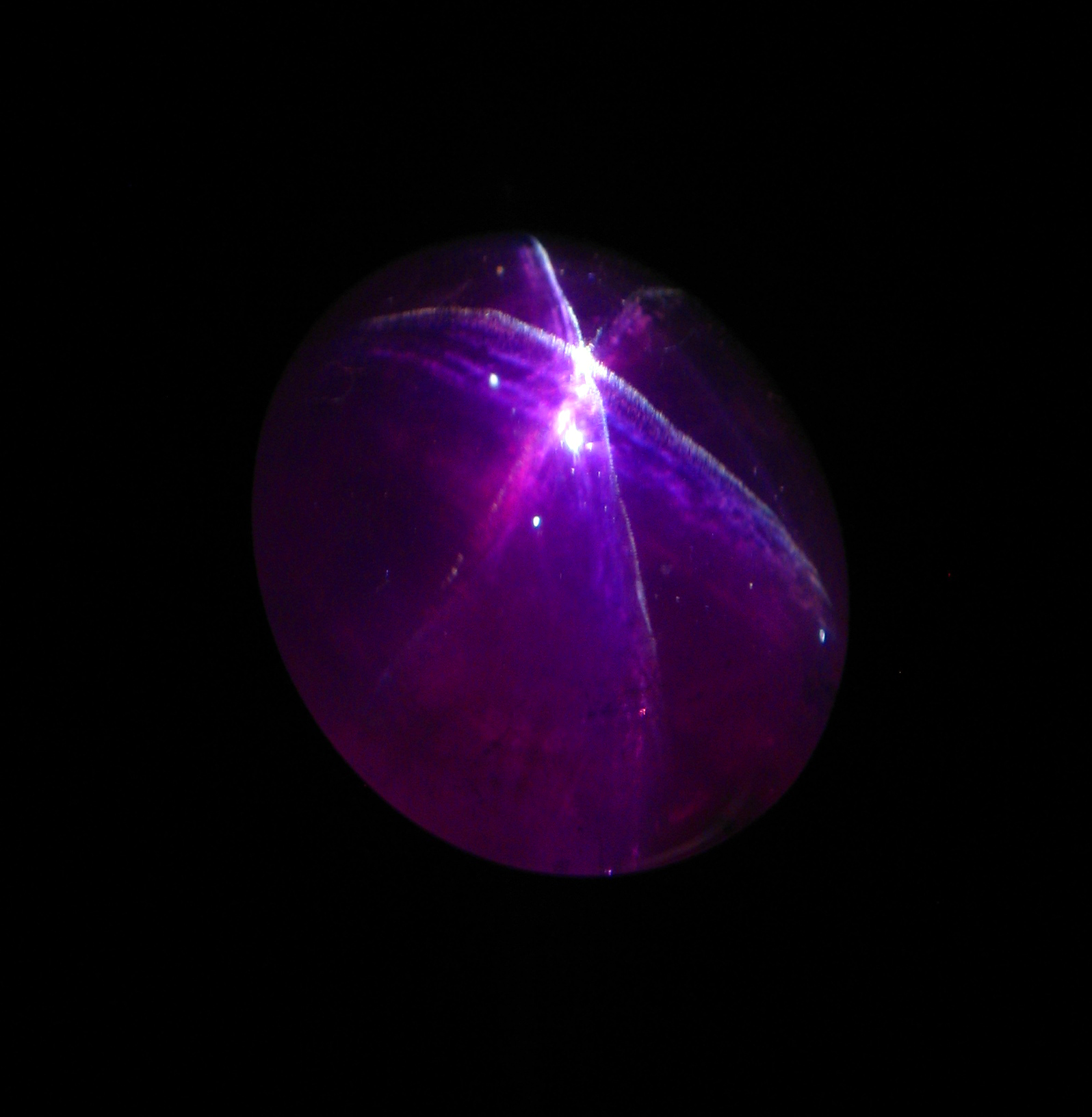
Rosser Reeves Ruby

The Rosser Reeves Ruby is one of the world's largest and finest star rubies, weighing 138.7 carats (27.74 g). This Sri Lankan stone is renowned for its great color and well-defined star pattern. The stone is named after advertising mogul Rosser Reeves. Reeves, who donated the gem to the Smithsonian in 1965, had carried it around as a lucky stone, and referred to it as "his baby".

== History ==
Reeves often claimed that he had acquired the stone at an auction in Istanbul in the mid-1950s. He had actually bought the stone from Robert C. Nelson Jr. of New York City who was acting on behalf of Firestone & Parson of Boston. Firestone & Parson sold the gem for Paul Fisher of New York. Robert Fisher, Paul's father, had bought the ruby at an auction in London in 1953. At the time the ruby then weighed just over 140 carats (28 g), but was very heavily scratched, and a few carats were removed in the re-polishing. The re-polishing also helped to center the stone's star.

The Rosser Reeves Ruby is on display at the Smithsonian Museum of Natural History.

== See also ==
- List of individual gemstones
- List of rubies by size
