= G. Vidyaraj =

Indian gem collector

G Vidyaraj is a retired gem collector who supposedly owns some of the largest gems in the world, including the Rajaratna ruby and the Neelanjali Ruby. It is claimed that he is a direct descendant of the rulers of the Vijayanagar raja of Hampi in Karnataka, which is where he claims the rubies originate from.
