= Neelanjali Ruby =

World's largest double-star ruby

The Neelanjali Ruby (also known as Neelanjali Star Ruby), at 1,370 carats (274 g), is the world's largest double-star ruby.

== Description ==
A ruby is known as a "star ruby" if it contains an asterism (distinctive star-shaped light refraction) in the gem. The Neelanjali Ruby is the biggest star ruby in the world. It has 12 points, which makes it a double-star ruby.

== Ownership ==
The Neelanjali ruby, along with the Rajarathna ruby, was used as a Shiva lingam and was worshipped for centuries in the home of the family that owned it. The ruby belongs to G. Vidyaraj, the scion of the Aravidu dynasty which was the last of the four imperial lineages to rule the Vijayanagara Empire. It is reported to be in safekeeping in Bangalore, India.

== See also ==
- List of individual gemstones
- List of rubies by size
