= Estrela de Fura =

55.22-carat ruby

- Type of stone: ruby
- Weight: 101 carats (initial), 55.22 carats (final)
- Colour: Vivid red "pigeon’s blood"
- Country of origin: Montepuez, Mozambique
- Discovered: July 21, 2022
- Estimated value: $34.8 million

Estrela de Fura is a 55.22-carat ruby, and in its rough shape, is considered amongst the largest gem quality rubies ever mined (101-carat). The stone is characterized by an extremely rare vivid red hue, fluorescence, and clarity. The gem was originally discovered in the Montepuez ruby mine in Mozambique, and its name is a Portuguese translation derived from Mozambique's official language. Estrela da Fura means "Star of Fura."

== History ==
The ruby was discovered by Dubai-based FURA Gems in its mine in Mozambique on July 21, 2022.

Before its unveiling and cutting, Daniel Nyfeler, managing director of Gübelin Gem Lab, stated: "the Estrela de Fura ruby is likely to yield an intense, saturated red colour once fully and properly faceted with adequate proportions, is relatively free of eye-visible inclusions. Considering its very large size, the vivid red colour, and clarity characteristics of this ruby give it an extraordinary potential to become one of the largest high-quality faceted rubies ever seen."

On September 4, 2022, Estrela da Fura was unveiled at an event held by the Dubai Multi Commodities Centre (DMCC) at the Dubai Diamond Exchange (DDE).

== Cutting ==
In January 2023, Fura sought the guidance of an international advisors, including French gem company Garaude, SAS and 3D engineers from Bellerophon Gemlab to assess cutting options. Garaude highlighted the rough had tremendous potential as well as significant challenges.

After conducting a series of studies to determine the best weight, shape, and cutting angles, the ruby was cut and polished in Bangkok by the hands of master gem cutter, Chirapat Yingthawiphiphat from Garaude. The outcome resulted in a 55.22-carat ruby.

Sotheby's unveiled the faceted ruby in Hong Kong on April 5, 2023. Subsequently, its worldwide tour included exhibitions in Taipei, China, Singapore, Geneva, and Dubai.

== Auction ==
On June 8, 2023, the "Magnificent Jewels" sale took place in New York, organised by Sotheby's. The ruby was successfully sold for $34.8 million, making it the largest and most expensive ruby ever to be auctioned.

The bidding started at $21 million, and an anonymous telephone bidder acquired it for an additional $9 million, plus fees and commissions.

Sotheby's auction house officially declared the Estrela de Fura as the most valuable and significant ruby ever offered for sale, emphasising its rarity and uniqueness.

Previously, the auction record for a ruby was held by the "Sunrise Ruby," a 25.59-carat gemstone discovered in Myanmar, which achieved a sale price of $30.3 million in Geneva, Switzerland, in 2015.

== See also ==
- List of rubies by size
