= Prince of Burma =

190-gram uncut ruby

The Prince of Burma is an uncut ruby, crystallized on a marble deposit, weighing 190 g (approximately 950 carat), and, for the most part, of gem quality. One of the biggest and rarest rubies in the world, it was found in the Dattaw-Mine in Mogok, Myanmar, in 1996.

== Mogok rubies ==
The red colouring of the rubies is due to colour-generating metallic oxides engrained in the crystalline structures. As the rubies from Mogok have formed in marble surroundings with a low content of iron, they display a particularly intense luminosity, which sets off the natural carmine red of the rubies. The best specimens are of "pigeon-blood" colour and therefore especially rare and precious. Most of the raw rubies are cut in Mogok since the market for cut rubies is much bigger. It is therefore quite unusual for an uncut ruby like the Prince of Burma to leave the country.

== Heist in Milan ==
A robbery occurred in August 2008 at which prospective buyers turned out to be criminals. On his way to the appointment, the German gemstone trader was deliberately hit by a car and his briefcase stolen. Severely injured, the trader was taken to hospital while the thieves escaped with the gem. After a joint investigation of German and Austrian authorities three suspects were arrested in a hotel in Villach, Austria on November 4, 2008. The booty, a gemstone collection including the Prince of Burma, was secured.

== Processing ==
Despite the fact that the Prince of Burma has not been heat-treated, it has the unique pigeon-blood red colour characteristic of the rubies from Mogok. Due to the evenly crystallized parts of the Prince of Burma, it might be possible to cut a gem of high quality weighing as much as 300 carat. This would make it one of the biggest cut rubies in the world. It is, however, doubtful if this will be attempted since the uncut Prince of Burma is unique as it is, its sentimental as well as its material value being almost inestimable.

== See also ==
- List of rubies by size
