= Winza =

Mining location in Tanzania

Coordinates: 7°01′22″S 36°21′35″E

Winza is a mining location in Mpwapwa District, Dodoma Region, Tanzania, Africa. It is known for ruby mining.

The Winza mines are in the Usagaran Belt which is a metamorphic zone. Rubies were discovered in the area in 2007.
