= Liberty Bell Ruby =

Ruby sculpture

The Liberty Bell Ruby

The Liberty Bell Ruby is a sculpture crafted from the world's largest mined ruby, discovered in East Africa in the 1950s. It weighs four pounds, is eight and a half thousand carats (8,500), and is sculpted into a miniature form of the Liberty Bell. It has 50 diamonds set in it and is valued at $2 million.

The ruby was created in 1976 for Beverly Hills-based Kazanjian Brothers jewelry company by sculptor Alfonso de Vivanco for the United States Bicentennial. It was made in the same spirit as sapphire busts of presidents that the jeweler's charitable foundation presented to the White House when Dwight D. Eisenhower was president.

== Theft ==
It was being held on behalf of a foundation at a jewelry store in Delaware when it was stolen in a heist on November 1, 2011. A $10,000 reward was offered for any information leading to the arrest and conviction for those responsible. On February 20, 2014, four men were arrested and indicted for the heist. Police have little hope that the Liberty Bell Ruby will be recovered.

== See also ==
- Sunrise Ruby
- List of rubies by size
