= Cardinal gem =

Traditional gem classification

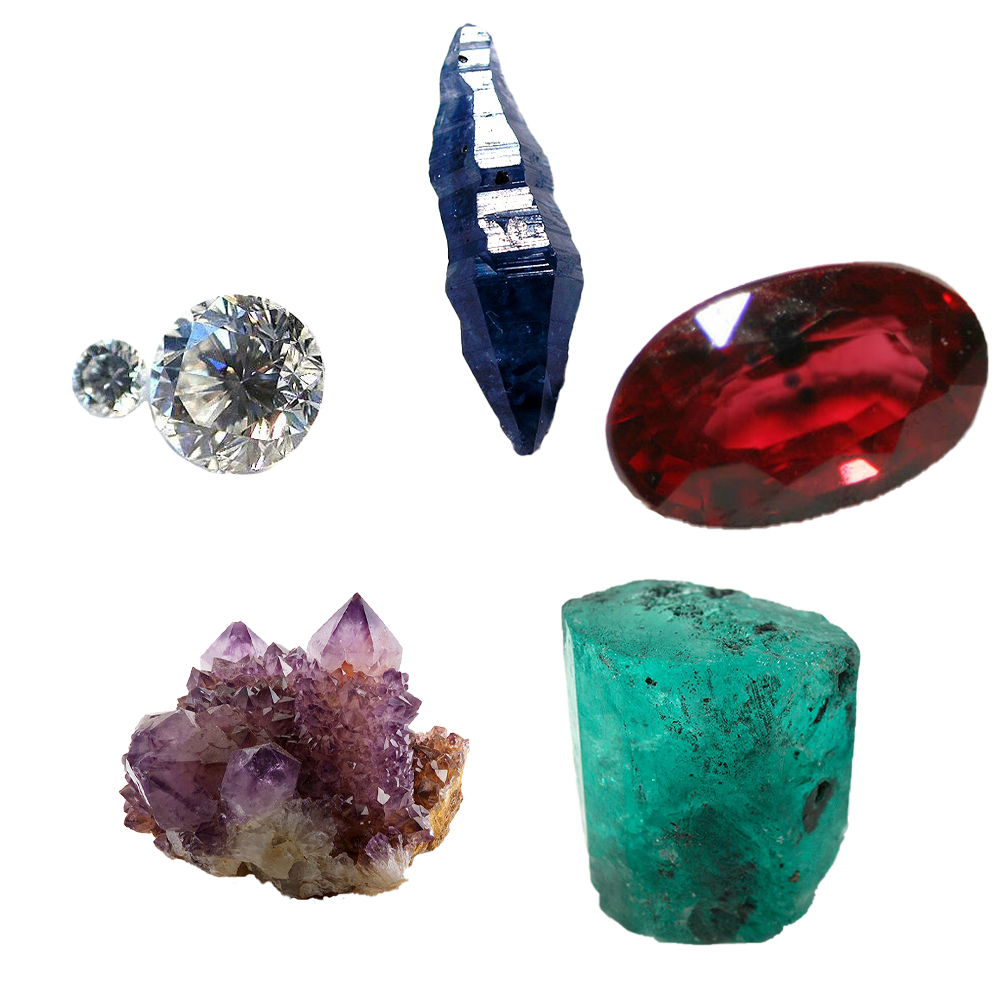
The five cardinal gems. Clockwise from top: sapphire, ruby, emerald, amethyst, diamond.

Cardinal gems are gemstones which have traditionally been considered precious above all others. The classification of the cardinal gems dates back to antiquity, and was largely determined by ceremonial or religious use as well as rarity. The term has largely fallen out of use.

The five traditional cardinal gems are:

- amethyst (purple) – Rare and precious in the Old World until large deposits were found in Brazil.
- diamond (transparent)
- emerald (green)
- ruby (red)
- sapphire (blue)
