= Ruby =

Variety of corundum; mineral; gemstone

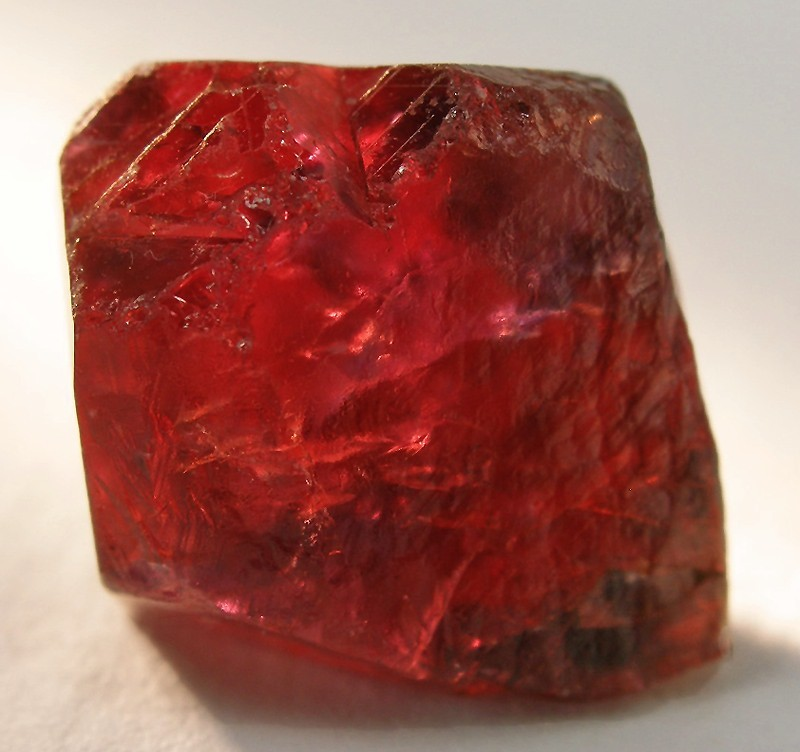
- A ruby crystal from Dodoma Region, Tanzania

General
- Category: Oxide minerals
- Formula: Aluminum oxide with chromium, Al_{2}O_{3}:Cr
- IMA status: Variety of corundum
- Crystal system: Trigonal
- Crystal class: Hexagonal scalenohedral (3̅m); H-M symbol: (3̅2/m)
- Space group: R3̅c

Identification
- Color: Orangy red through strongly purplish red.
- Crystal habit: Terminated tabular hexagonal prisms
- Cleavage: No true cleavage
- Fracture: Conchoidal, splintery
- Tenacity: Brittle
- Mohs scale hardness: 9.0
- Luster: Subadamantine, vitreous, pearly (on partings)
- Streak: White
- Diaphaneity: Transparent, translucent
- Specific gravity: 3.97–4.05
- Optical properties: Uniaxial/−
- Refractive index: n_{ω}=1.768–1.772 n_{ε}=1.760–1.763
- Birefringence: 0.008 to 0.010
- Pleochroism: Strong: purplish-red – orangy-red
- Dispersion: 0.018
- Ultraviolet fluorescence: Red under longwave
- Common impurities: Cr. (sometimes: Ti, Fe)

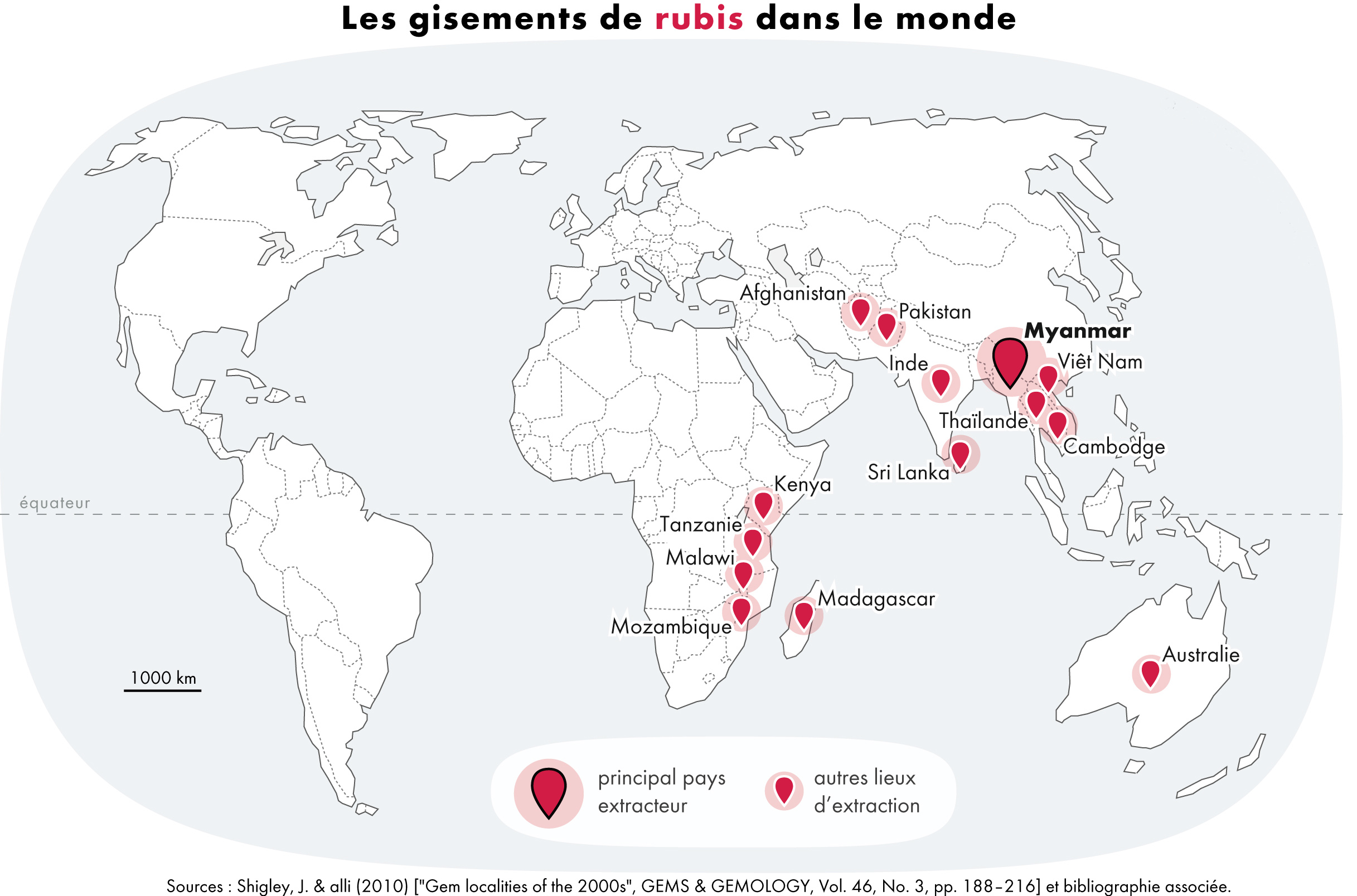
The main ruby-producing countries

Ruby is a pinkish-red to blood-red-colored gemstone, a variety of the mineral corundum, consisting of aluminium oxide (α-Al_{2}O_{3}). Ruby is one of the most popular traditional jewelry gems and is very durable. Other varieties of gem-quality corundum are called sapphires, and rubies are also sometimes referred to as "red sapphires".

Ruby is one of the traditional cardinal gems, alongside amethyst, sapphire, emerald, and diamond. The word ruby comes from ruber, Latin for red. The color of a ruby is due to the presence of chromium.

Some gemstones that are popularly or historically called rubies, such as the Black Prince's Ruby in the British Imperial State Crown, are actually spinels. These were once known as "Balas rubies".

The quality of a ruby is determined by its color, cut, and clarity, which, along with carat weight, affect its value. The brightest and most valuable shade of red, called blood-red or pigeon blood, commands a large premium over other rubies of similar quality. After color comes clarity: similar to diamonds, a clear stone will command a premium, but a ruby without any needle-like rutile inclusions may indicate that the stone has been treated. Ruby is the traditional birthstone for July and is usually pinker than garnet, although some rhodolite garnets have a similar pinkish hue to most rubies. The world's most valuable ruby to be sold at auction is the Estrela de Fura, which sold for US$34.8 million.

== Physical properties ==
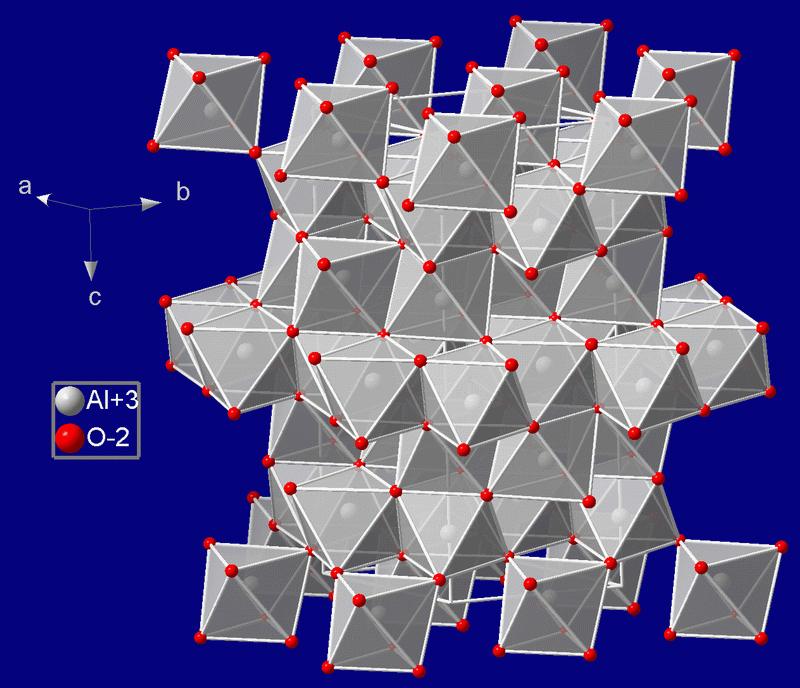
Crystal structure of rubies

Rubies have a hardness of 9.0 on the Mohs scale of mineral hardness. Among the natural gems, only moissanite and diamond are harder, with diamond having a Mohs hardness of 10.0 and moissanite falling somewhere in between corundum (ruby) and diamond in hardness. Sapphire, ruby, and pure corundum are α-alumina, the most stable form of Al_{2}O_{3}, in which 3 electrons leave each aluminium ion to join the regular octahedral group of six nearby O^{2−} ions; in pure corundum this leaves all of the aluminium ions with a very stable configuration of no unpaired electrons or unfilled energy levels, and the crystal is perfectly colorless, and transparent except for flaws.

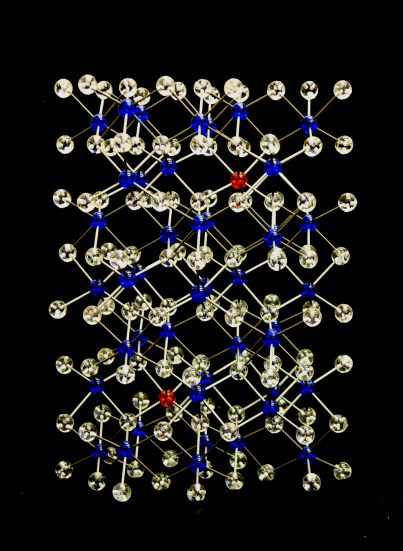
Crystal structure of ruby showing the substitution of Al^{3+} ions (blue) with Cr^{3+} (red). The substitution density of Cr^{3+} ions in this model is approximately 2%, approximating the maximum doping normally encountered.

When a chromium atom replaces an occasional aluminium atom, it too loses 3 electrons to become a chromium^{3+} ion to maintain the charge balance of the Al_{2}O_{3} crystal. However, the Cr^{3+} ions are larger and have electron orbitals in different directions than aluminium. The octahedral arrangement of the O^{2−} ions is distorted, and the energy levels of the different orbitals of those Cr^{3+} ions are slightly altered because of the directions to the O^{2−} ions. Those energy differences correspond to absorption in the ultraviolet, violet, and yellow-green regions of the spectrum.

Transmittance of ruby in optical and near-IR spectra. Note the two broad violet and yellow-green absorption bands and one narrow absorption band at the wavelength of 694 nm, which is the wavelength of the ruby laser.

If one percent of the aluminium ions are replaced by chromium in ruby, the yellow-green absorption results in a red color for the gem. Additionally, absorption at any of the above wavelengths stimulates fluorescent emission of 694-nanometer-wavelength red light, which adds to its red color and perceived luster. The chromium concentration in artificial rubies can be adjusted during the crystal growth process to be ten to twenty times lower than in natural gemstones. Theodore Maiman says that "because of the low chromium level in these crystals they display a lighter red color than gemstone ruby and are referred to as pink ruby."

After absorbing short-wavelength light, there is a short interval of time when the crystal lattice of ruby is in an excited state before fluorescence occurs. If 694-nanometer photons pass through the crystal during that time, they can stimulate more fluorescent photons to be emitted in-phase with them, thus strengthening the intensity of that red light. By arranging mirrors or other means to pass emitted light repeatedly through the crystal, a ruby laser in this way produces a very high intensity of coherent red light.

All natural rubies have imperfections in them, including color impurities and inclusions of rutile needles known as "silk". Gemologists use these needle inclusions found in natural rubies to distinguish them from synthetics, simulants, or substitutes. Usually, the rough stone is heated before cutting. These days, almost all rubies are treated in some form, with heat treatment being the most common practice. Untreated rubies of high quality command a large premium.

Some rubies show a three-point or six-point asterism or "star". These rubies are cut into cabochons to display the effect properly. Asterisms are best visible with a single-light source and move across the stone as the light moves or the stone is rotated. Such effects occur when light is reflected off the "silk" (the structurally oriented rutile needle inclusions) in a certain way. This is one example where inclusions increase the value of a gemstone. Furthermore, rubies can show color changes—though this occurs very rarely—as well as chatoyancy or the "cat's eye" effect.

=== Versus pink sapphire ===
Generally, gemstone-quality corundum in all shades of red, including pink, are called rubies. However, in the United States, a minimum color saturation must be met to be called a ruby; otherwise, the stone will be called a pink sapphire. Drawing a distinction between rubies and pink sapphires is relatively new, having arisen sometime in the 20th century. Often, the distinction between ruby and pink sapphire is not clear and can be debated. As a result of the difficulty and subjectiveness of such distinctions, trade organizations such as the International Colored Gemstone Association (ICGA) have adopted the broader definition for ruby which encompasses its lighter shades, including pink.

== Occurrence and mining ==
Historically, rubies have been mined in Thailand, in the Pailin and Samlout District of Cambodia, as well as in Afghanistan, Australia, Brazil, Colombia, India, Namibia, Japan, and Scotland. After the Second World War, ruby deposits were found in Madagascar, Mozambique, Nepal, Pakistan, Tajikistan, Tanzania, and Vietnam. It occurs in association with pargasite, zoisite, calcite, phlogopite, painite, sapphire, pyrite and fuchsite.

The Montepuez ruby mine in northeastern Mozambique is situated on one of the most significant ruby deposits in the world, although, rubies were only discovered here for the first time in 2009. In less than a decade, Mozambique has become the world's most productive source for gem-quality ruby. In 2025, its production capacity is expected to increase from 200 to 600 tons per hour.· Currently, Mozambique rubies are some of the most sought-after in the world, rivalling even the famous Burmese Rubies. In 2022, the mine reportedly produced approximately 10 million carats of rubies, making it one of the most prolific and consistent sources of high-quality rubies today.

North Macedonia is the only country in mainland Europe to have naturally occurring rubies. They can mainly be found around the city of Prilep. Macedonian rubies have a unique raspberry color.

A few rubies have been found in the U.S. states of Montana, North Carolina, South Carolina and Wyoming.

Spinel, another red gemstone, is sometimes found along with rubies in the same gem gravel or marble. Red spinels may be mistaken for rubies by those lacking experience with gems. However, the finest red spinels, now heavily sought, can have values approaching all but the finest examples of ruby. One of the most famous individual "rubies", the Black Prince's Ruby (today set in the Imperial State Crown of the United Kingdom), is actually a spinel.

The Mogok Valley in Upper Myanmar (Burma) was for centuries the world's main source for rubies. That region has produced some exceptional rubies; however, in recent years few good rubies have been found. In central Myanmar, the area of Mong Hsu began producing rubies during the 1990s and rapidly became the world's main ruby mining area. The most recently found ruby deposit in Myanmar is in Namya (Namyazeik) located in the northern state of Kachin.

In Azad Jammu and Kashmir, there are vast proven reserves of millions of rubies, worth up to half a billion dollars. However, as of 2017 there was only one mine (at Chitta Katha) due to lack of investment. In Afghanistan, rubies are mined at Jegdalek. In 2017 the Aappaluttoq mine in Greenland began running. However, operations at the Greenland ruby mine have been suspended due to poor production. Most rubies mined from Greenland were heavily fractured and had to be heated with Borax powder.

The rubies in Greenland are said to be among the oldest in the world at approximately 3 billion years old. The Aappaluttoq mine in Greenland is located 160 kilometers south of Nuuk, the capital of Greenland. The rubies are traceable from mine to market.

== Factors affecting value ==
Rubies, as with other gemstones, are graded using criteria known as the four Cs, namely color, cut, clarity and carat weight. Rubies are also evaluated on the basis of their geographic origin.

=== Color ===
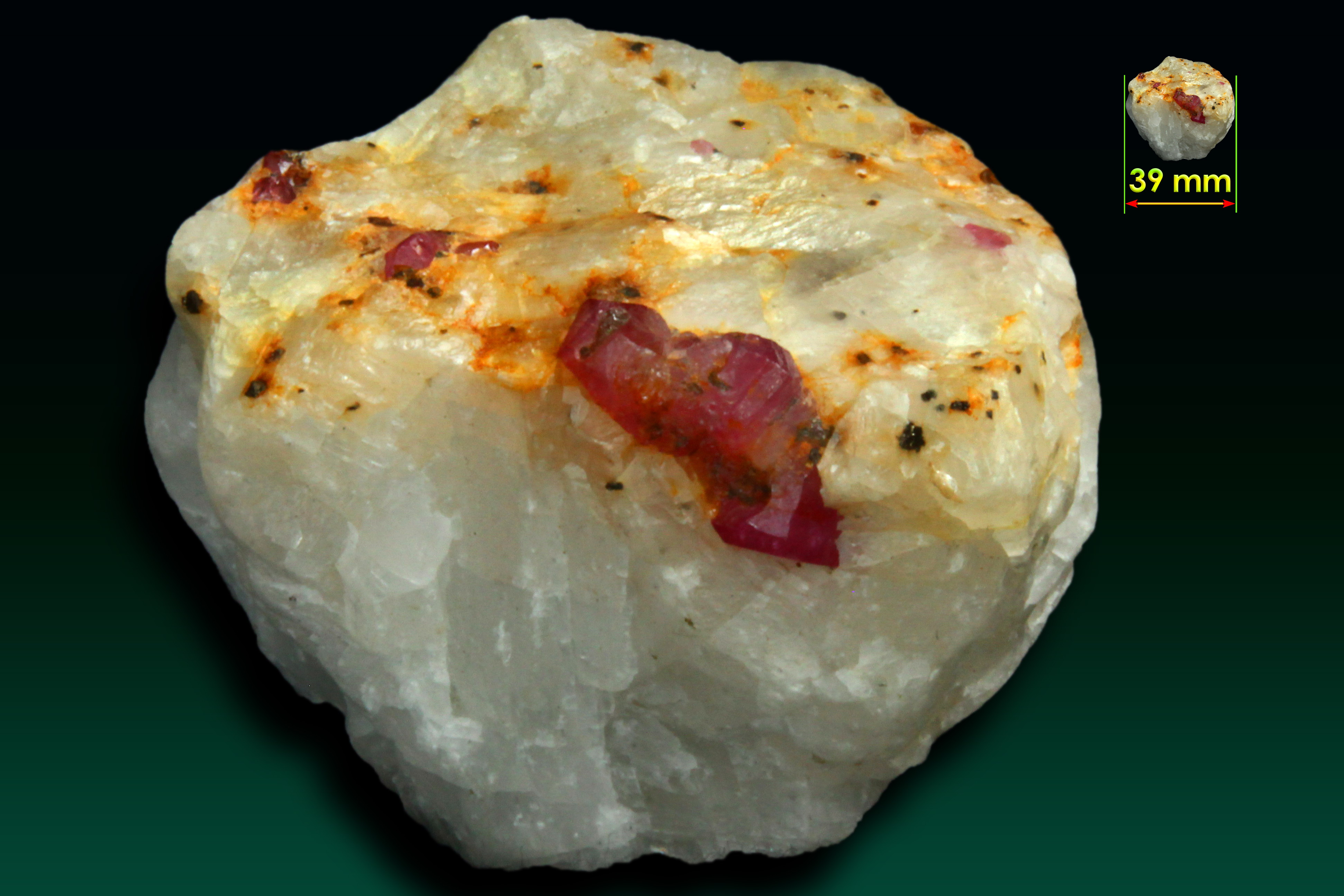
Ruby (Corundum) - Hunza Valley, div. Gilgit, Northern Areas, Pakistan.

In the evaluation of colored gemstones, color is the most important factor. Color divides into three components: hue, saturation and tone. Hue refers to color as the term is used in a normal setting. Transparent gemstones occur in the pure spectral hues of red, orange, yellow, green, blue, violet. In nature, there are rarely pure hues, so when speaking of the hue of a gemstone, we speak of primary and secondary and sometimes tertiary hues. Ruby is defined to be red. All other hues of the gem species corundum are called sapphire. Ruby may exhibit a range of secondary hues, including orange, purple, violet, and pink.

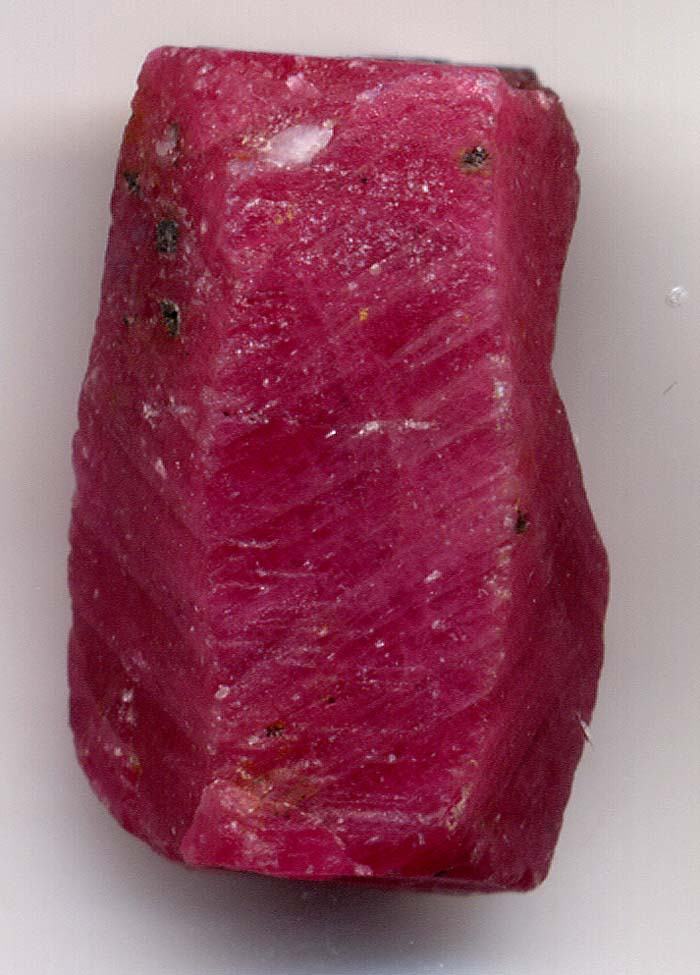
A naturally occurring ruby crystal

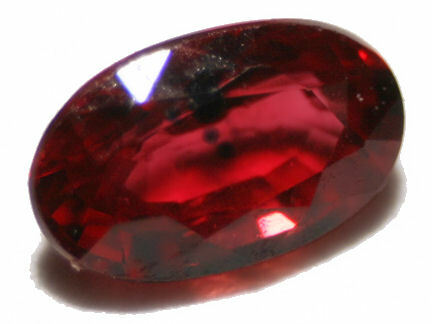
Natural ruby with inclusions

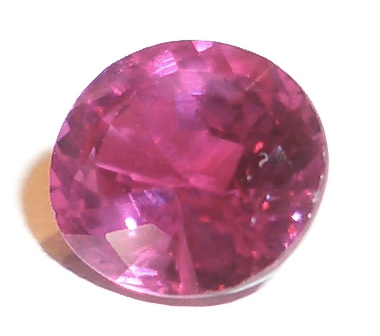
A cut pink ruby

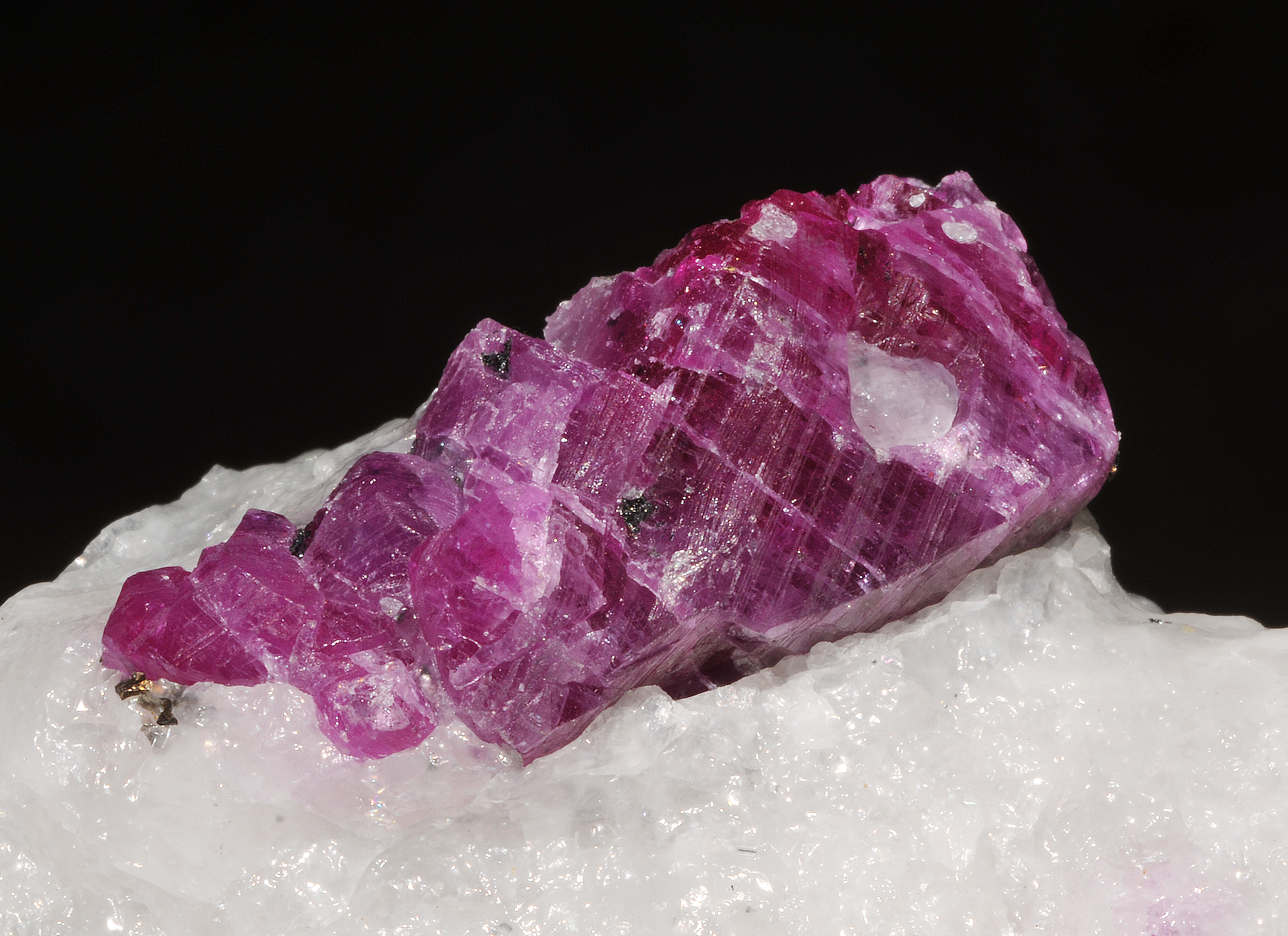
Purple rubies

=== Clarity ===
Because rubies host many inclusions, their clarity is evaluated by the inclusions' size, number, location, and visibility. Rubies with the highest clarity grades are known as "eye-clean," because their inclusions are the least visible to the naked human eye. Rubies may also have thin, intersecting inclusions called silk. Silk can scatter light, brightening the gem's appearance, and the presence of silk can also show whether a ruby has been previously heat treated, since intense heat will degrade a ruby's silk.

== Treatments and enhancements ==
Improving the quality of gemstones by treating them is common practice. Some treatments are used in almost all cases and are therefore considered acceptable. During the late 1990s, a large supply of low-cost materials caused a sudden surge in supply of heat-treated rubies, leading to a downward pressure on ruby prices.

Improvements used include color alteration, improving transparency by dissolving rutile inclusions, healing of fractures (cracks) or even completely filling them.

The most common treatment is the application of heat. Most rubies at the lower end of the market are heat treated to improve color, remove purple tinge, blue patches, and silk. These heat treatments typically occur around temperatures of 1800 °C (3300 °F). Some rubies undergo a process of low tube heat, when the stone is heated over charcoal of a temperature of about 1300 °C (2400 °F) for 20 to 30 minutes. The silk is partially broken, and the color is improved.

Another treatment, which has become more frequent in recent years, is lead glass filling. Filling the fractures inside the ruby with lead glass (or a similar material) dramatically improves the transparency of the stone, making previously unsuitable rubies fit for applications in jewelry. The process is done in four steps:

1. The rough stones are pre-polished to eradicate all surface impurities that may affect the process
2. The rough is cleaned with hydrogen fluoride
3. The first heating process during which no fillers are added. The heating process eradicates impurities inside the fractures. Although this can be done at temperatures up to 1400 °C (2500 °F) it most likely occurs at a temperature of around 900 °C (1600 °F) since the rutile silk is still intact.
4. The second heating process in an electrical oven with different chemical additives. Different solutions and mixes have shown to be successful; however, mostly lead-containing glass-powder is used at present. The ruby is dipped into oils, then covered with powder, embedded on a tile and placed in the oven where it is heated at around 900 °C (1600 °F) for one hour in an oxidizing atmosphere. The orange colored powder transforms upon heating into a transparent to yellow-colored paste, which fills all fractures. After cooling the color of the paste is fully transparent and dramatically improves the overall transparency of the ruby.

If a color needs to be added, the glass powder can be "enhanced" with copper or other metal oxides as well as elements such as sodium, calcium, potassium etc.

The second heating process can be repeated three to four times, even applying different mixtures. When jewelry containing rubies is heated (for repairs) it should not be coated with boric acid or any other substance, as this can etch the surface; it does not have to be "protected" like a diamond.

The treatment can be identified by noting bubbles in cavities and fractures using a 10× loupe.

== Synthesis and imitation ==
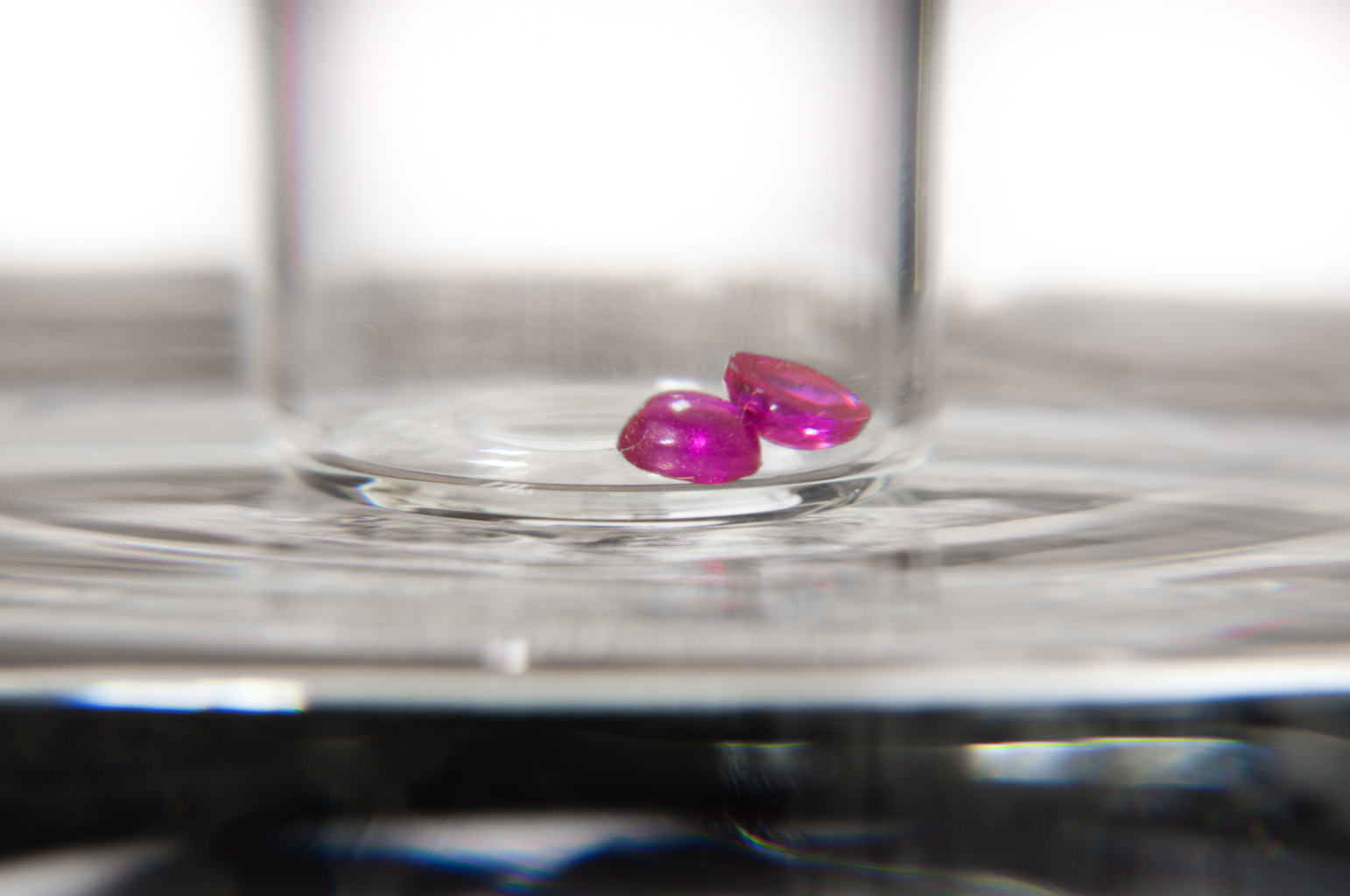

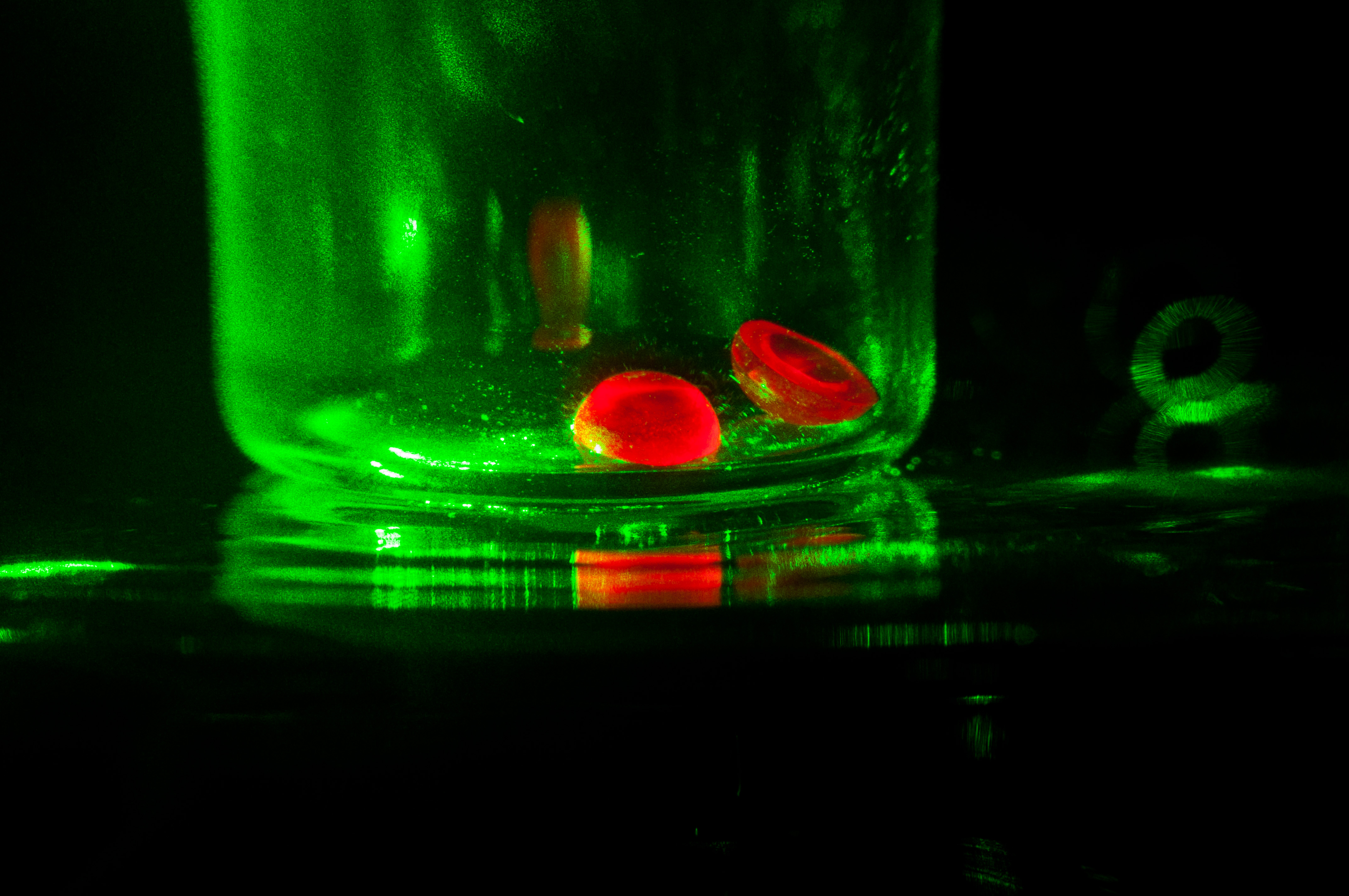
Artificial ruby under a normal light (top) and under a green laser light (bottom). Red light is emitted.

In 1837, Gaudin made the first synthetic rubies by fusing potash alum at a high temperature with a little chromium as a pigment. In 1847, Ebelmen made white sapphire by fusing alumina in boric acid. In 1877, Edmond Frémy and industrial glass-maker Charles Feil made crystal corundum from which small stones could be cut. In 1887, Fremy and Auguste Verneuil manufactured artificial ruby by fusing BaF_{2} and Al_{2}O_{3} with a little chromium at red heat.

In 1903, Verneuil announced he could produce synthetic rubies on a commercial scale using this flame fusion process, later also known as the Verneuil process. By 1910, Verneuil's laboratory had expanded into a 30 furnace production facility, with annual gemstone production having reached 1,000 kilograms (2,000 lb) in 1907.

Other processes in which synthetic rubies can be produced are through Czochralski's pulling process, flux process, and the hydrothermal process. Most synthetic rubies originate from flame fusion, due to the low costs involved. Synthetic rubies may have no imperfections visible to the naked eye but magnification may reveal curved striae and gas bubbles. The fewer the number and the less obvious the imperfections, the more valuable the ruby is; unless there are no imperfections (i.e., a perfect ruby), in which case it will be suspected of being artificial. Dopants are added to some manufactured rubies so they can be identified as synthetic, but most need gemological testing to determine their origin.

Synthetic rubies have technological uses as well as gemological ones. Rods of synthetic ruby are used to make ruby lasers and masers. The first working laser was made by Theodore H. Maiman in 1960. Maiman used a solid-state light-pumped synthetic ruby to produce red laser light at a wavelength of 694 nanometers (nm). Ruby lasers are still in use.

Rubies are also used in applications where high hardness is required such as at wear-exposed locations in mechanical clockworks, or as scanning probe tips in a coordinate measuring machine.

Imitation rubies are also marketed. Red spinels, red garnets, and colored glass have been falsely claimed to be rubies. Imitations go back to Roman times and already in the 17th century techniques were developed to color foil red—by burning scarlet wool in the bottom part of the furnace—which was then placed under the imitation stone. Trade terms such as balas ruby for red spinel and rubellite for red tourmaline can mislead unsuspecting buyers. Such terms are therefore discouraged from use by many gemological associations such as the Laboratory Manual Harmonisation Committee (LMHC).

== Records and famous examples ==
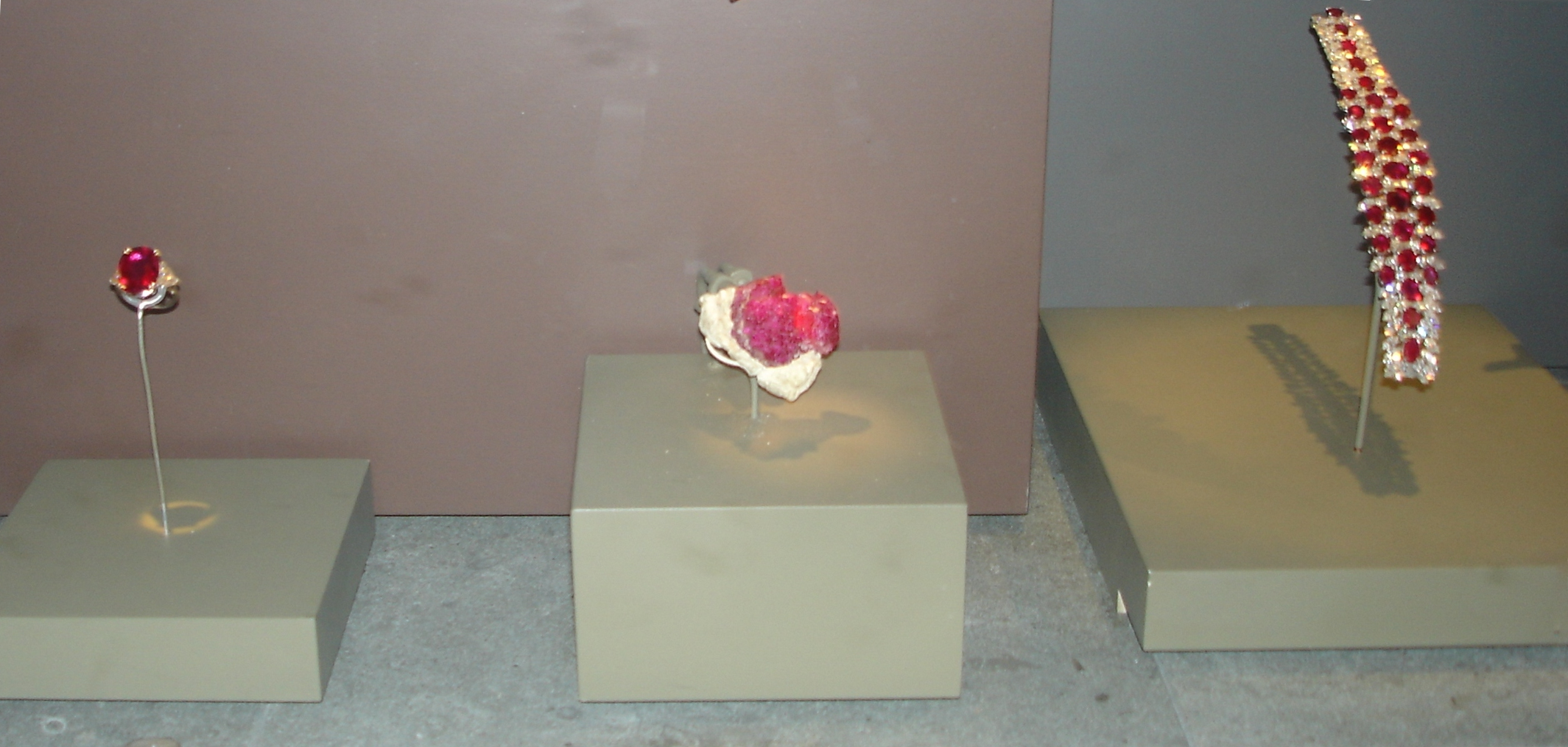
Rubies at the National Museum of Natural History, Washington, D.C., USA

- The Smithsonian's National Museum of Natural History in Washington, D.C., has some of the world's largest and finest ruby gemstones. The 23.1-carat (4.62 g) Burmese ruby, set in a platinum ring with diamonds, was donated by businessman and philanthropist Peter Buck in memory of his late wife Carmen Lúcia. This gemstone displays a richly saturated red color combined with an exceptional transparency. The finely proportioned cut provides vivid red reflections. The stone was mined from the Mogok region of Burma (now Myanmar) in the 1930s.
- In 2007, the London jeweler Garrard & Co featured a heart-shaped 40.63-carat ruby on their website.
- On 13/14 December 2011, Elizabeth Taylor's complete jewelry collection was auctioned by Christie's. Several ruby-set pieces were included in the sale, notably a ring set with an 8.24 ct gem that broke the 'price-per-carat' record for rubies (US$512,925 per carat – i.e., over US$4.2 million in total), and a necklace that sold for over US$3.7 million.
- The Liberty Bell Ruby is the largest mined ruby in the world. It was stolen in a heist in 2011.
- The Sunrise Ruby was the world's most expensive ruby, most expensive colored gemstone, and most expensive gemstone other than a diamond when it sold at auction in Switzerland to an anonymous buyer for US$30 million In May 2015.
- A synthetic ruby crystal became the gain medium in the world's first optical laser, conceived, designed and constructed by Theodore H. "Ted" Maiman, on 16 May 1960 at Hughes Research Laboratories.

The concept of electromagnetic radiation amplification through the mechanism of stimulated emission had already been successfully demonstrated in the laboratory by way of the maser, using other materials such as ammonia and, later, ruby, but the ruby laser was the first device to work at optical (694.3 nm) wavelengths. Maiman's prototype laser is still in working order.

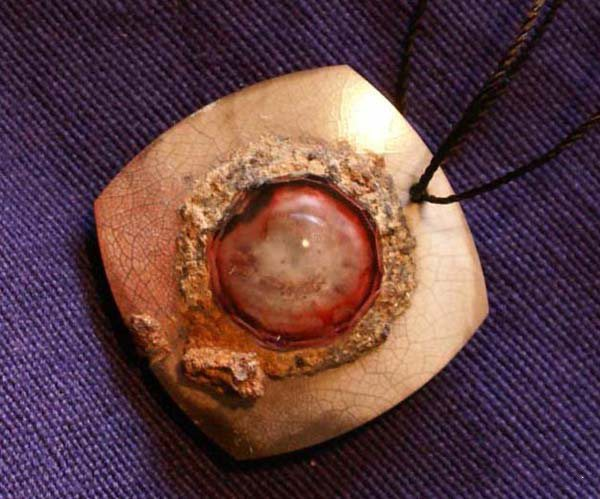
The Ruby Eye Amulet from Mesopotamia, Adilnor Collection, Sweden.

== Historical and cultural references ==
- An early recorded transport and trading of rubies arises in the literature on the North Silk Road of China, wherein about 200 BC rubies were carried along this ancient trackway moving westward from China.
- Rubies have always been held in high esteem in Asian countries. They were used to ornament armor, scabbards, and harnesses of noblemen in India and China. Rubies were laid beneath the foundation of buildings to secure good fortune to the structure.
- A traditional Hindu astrological belief holds rubies as the "gemstone of the Sun and also the heavenly deity Surya, the leader of the nine heavenly bodies (Navagraha)." The belief is that worshiping and wearing rubies causes the Sun to be favorable to the wearer.
- In the Marvel comic books, the Godstone is a ruby found on the Moon by John Jameson, the son of J. Jonah Jameson. It became activated by moonlight and grafted itself to his chest, which turned him into the Man-Wolf.
- In the 1939 film adaptation of Frank L. Baum's The Wonderful Wizard of Oz the "Ruby Slippers" are a driving element within the plot. The slippers are mysteriously magical footwear made of rubies. The equivalent shoes were made of silver in the novel, but were changed to ruby in the film to showcase the then-novel three-strip Technicolor technology with which the film was shot.

== See also ==
- Anyolite
- List of individual gemstones
- List of minerals
- Shelby Gem Factory
- Verneuil process
- Emerald
