= Martin Sheen filmography =

Performances by American actor

The following is the complete filmography of American actor Martin Sheen.

== Film ==
Year	Title	Role	Notes
1967	The Incident	Artie Connors	
1968	The Subject Was Roses	Timmy Cleary	
1970	Catch-22	1st Lieutenant Dobbs	
1970	The Cliff	Charlie Devon	
1972	No Drums, No Bugles	Ashby Gatrell	
1972	Pickup on 101	Les	
1972	Rage	Major Holliford	
1973	When the Line Goes Through	Bluff Jackson	
1973	Badlands	Kit Carruthers	
1973	The Conflict (Catholics)	Father James Kinsella	
1974	The Legend of Earl Durand	Luther Sykes	
1974	The California Kid	Michael McCord	
1975	The Last Survivors	Alexander William Holmes	
1975	Sweet Hostage	Leonard Hatch	
1976	The Cassandra Crossing	Robby Navarro	
1976	The Little Girl Who Lives Down the Lane	Frank Hallet	
1979	Apocalypse Now	Captain Benjamin L. Willard	
1979	Eagle's Wing	Pike	
1980	The Final Countdown	Warren Lasky	
1981	Loophole	Stephen Booker	
1982	Gandhi	Vince Walker	
1982	That Championship Season	Tom Daley	
1982	In the Custody of Strangers	Frank Caldwell	
1982	Enigma	Alex Holbeck	
1983	In the King of Prussia	Judge Samuel Salus II	
1983	Man, Woman and Child	Robert Beckwith	
1983	The Dead Zone	Greg Stillson	
1984	Firestarter	Captain James Hollister	
1986	A State of Emergency	Dr. Alex Carmody	
1986	Shattered Spirits	Lyle Mollencamp	
1987	The Believers	Cal Jamison	
1987	Siesta	Del	
1987	Wall Street	Carl Fox	
1988	Da	Charlie Tynan	
1988	Judgment in Berlin	Herbert Jay Stern	
1989	Marked for Murder	Man In Park	
1989	Cold Front	John Hyde	
1989	Beverly Hills Brats	Dr. Jeffrey Miller	
1989	Nightbreaker	Dr. Alexander Brown	
1989	Beyond the Stars	Paul Andrews	
1990	Cadence	Master Sergeant Otis V. McKinney	Also director
1991	Touch and Die	Frank	
1991	The Maid	Anthony Wayne	
1991	JFK	Narrator	Voice
1992	Original Intent	Joe	
1993	My Home, My Prison	Narrator	
1993	Ghost Brigade	General Haworth	
1993	Fortunes of War	Francis Labeck	
1993	Hear No Evil	Lieutenant Brock	
1993	Hot Shots! Part Deux	Captain Benjamin L. Willard	Cameo
1993	Gettysburg	General Robert E. Lee	
1993	A Matter of Justice	Jack Brown	
1994	Guns of Honor	Jackson Baines Hardin	
1994	Hits!	Kelly	
1994	When the Bough Breaks	Captain Swaggert	
1994	Boca	Jesse James Montgomery	
1995	The American President	Chief of Staff A.J. McInnerney	
1995	Sacred Cargo	Father Andrew Kanvesky	
1995	Dillinger and Capone	John Dillinger	
1995	Running Wild	Dan Walker	
1995	Captain Nuke and the Bomber Boys	Jeff Snyder	
1995	A Hundred and One Nights	Himself	Cameo
1995	The Break	Gil Robbins	
1995	Dead Presidents	The Judge	
1995	Gospa	Father Jozo Zovko	
1996	The War at Home	Bob Collier	
1996	Entertaining Angels: The Dorothy Day Story	Peter Maurin	
1996	The Elevator	Sarge	
1997	Truth or Consequences, N.M.	Sir	
1997	An Act of Conscience	Narrator	Voice
1997	Spawn	CIA Director Jason Wynn	
1998	Family Attraction	President	Short film
1998	A Stranger in the Kingdom	Sigurd Moulton	
1998	Gunfighter	The Stranger	
1998	Monument Ave.	Hanlon	
1998	Shadrach	Narrator	Voice
1998	A Letter from Death Row	Mr. Raine	
1998	Free Money	New Warden	
1998	No Code of Conduct	Bill Peterson	
1999	Ninth Street	Father Frank	
1999	Lost & Found	Millstone	
1999	Storm	General James Roberts	
1999	A Texas Funeral	Grandpa Sparta	
2001	O	Coach Duke Goulding	
2002	Catch Me If You Can	Roger Strong	
2003	Mercy of the Sea	Frederik	
2003	The Commission	Deputy Attorney General Nicholas Katzenbach	
2004	Jerusalemski sindrom	Unknown	
2006	The Departed	Captain Oliver Queenan	
2006	Bobby	Jack Stevens	
2007	Talk to Me	E.G. Sonderling	
2007	Bordertown	George Morgan	
2007	Flatland: The Movie	Arthur Square	Voice
2008	A Single Woman	Unknown	Voice
2008	Man in the Mirror	9 roles	
2009	Echelon Conspiracy	Raymond Burke	
2009	Love Happens	Burke's Father-In-Law	
2009	Imagine That	Dante D'Enzo	
2009	The Kid: Chamaco	Dr. Frank Irwin	
2010	The Way	Thomas Avery	
2011	Stella Days	Daniel Barry	
2011	The Double	Tom Highland	
2012	Seeking a Friend for the End of the World	Frank Petersen	
2012	The Amazing Spider-Man	Ben Parker	
2014	Bhopal: A Prayer for Rain	Warren Anderson	
2014	Selma	Frank Minis Johnson	Uncredited
2014	Ask Me Anything	Glenn Warburg	
2014	The Boxcar Children	James Henry Alden	Voice
2015	Trash	Father Juilliard	
2015	Badge of Honor	Captain Richards	
2015	The Vessel	Father Douglas	
2016	Popstar: Never Stop Never Stopping	Himself	Cameo
2016	Rules Don't Apply	Noah Dietrich	
2018	Come Sunday	Oral Roberts	
2018	The Boxcar Children: Surprise Island	James Henry Alden	Voice
2019	Princess of the Row	John Austin	
2019	The Devil Has a Name	Ralph Wegis	
2021	Judas and the Black Messiah	FBI Director J. Edgar Hoover	
2021	12 Mighty Orphans	Doc Hall	
2023	Spider-Man: Across the Spider-Verse	Ben Parker	Archival footage from The Amazing Spider-Man
2024	Lost & Found in Cleveland	Dr. Austin Raybourne	

== Documentaries ==
Year	Film	Role
1968	Pat Neal Is Back	Himself
1985	Broken Rainbow	Narrator
1985	In the Name of the People	Narrator
1985	Spaceflight	Narrator
1986	Secrets of the Titanic	Narrator
1988	Walking After Midnight	Himself
1990	Doing Time Ten Years Later	Narrator
1991	Hearts of Darkness: A Filmmaker's Apocalypse	Himself
1994	Last Voyage of the Lusitania	Narrator
1997	187: Documented	Narrator
1997	Tudjman	Narrator
1997	Titanic: Anatomy of a Disaster	Narrator
1998	Taylor's Campaign	Narrator
1998	Holes in Heaven	Narrator
1999	A Conversation with Koko	Narrator
1999	The History Channel Presents: The Story of the 12 Apostles	Narrator
1999	World's Deadliest Earthquakes	Narrator
2000	World's Deadliest Storms	Narrator
2001	The Papp Project	Himself
2001	SOA: Guns and Greed	Himself
2001	Stockpile	Narrator
2001	Inside the Vatican	Narrator
2002	Cuba: The 40 Years War	Narrator
2002	The Making of Bret Michaels	Himself
2002	Tibet: Cry of the Snow Lion	Narrator
2002	Straight Up: Helicopters in Action	Narrator
2003	Hidden in Plain Sight	Narrator
2003	All the Presidents' Movies	Narrator
2003	The Perilous Fight	Narrator
2004	Learning to Sea	Narrator
2004	Winning New Hampshire	Himself
2004	Tell Them Who You Are	Narrator
2005	On the Line: Dissent in an Age of Terrorism	Himself
2005	James Dean: Forever Young	Narrator
2006	Who Killed the Electric Car?	Narrator
2006	Between Iraq and a Hard Place	Narrator
2007	Searching for George Washington	George Washington (voice)
2008	Flower in the Gun Barrel	Narrator
2008	They Killed Sister Dorothy	Narrator
2008	Vietnam-American Holocaust	Narrator
2009	One Water	Narrator
2009	The End of Poverty?	Narrator
2009	White House Revealed	Narrator
2010	Pax Americana and the Weaponization of Space	Himself
2010	Return to El Salvador	Narrator
2010	The Spirit	"The Octopuss"
2010	The Kennedy Detail	Narrator
2011	Curiosity	Host
2012	Who Do You Think You Are?	Himself
2012	Brothers on the Line	Narrator
2012	Death by China	Narrator
2013	The Second Cooler	Narrator
2013	Salinger	Himself
2013	Messenger of the Truth	Narrator
2015	American Hercules: Babe Ruth	Narrator
2015	Unity	Narrator
2016	Is O.J. Innocent? The Missing Evidence	Narrator
2017	The Home Front: Life in America During World War II	Narrator
2025	The Green Box: At the Heart of War	Narrator

== Television ==
Year	Title	Role	Notes
1960s–1980s	Insight	Various	Various episodes
1961	Route 66	'Packy', Gang leader	Episode "...And the Cat Jumped Over the Moon"
1962	Naked City	Phil Kasnick	Episode "The Night the Saints Lost Their Halos"
1963	Arrest and Trial	Dale	Episode "We May Be Better Strangers"
1963	East Side West Side	Vince Arno	Episode "You Can't Beat the System"
1963	The Outer Limits	Private Arthur Dix	Episode "Nightmare"
1964	My Three Sons	Randy Griggs	Episode "The Guys and the Dolls"
1966	NET Playhouse	Kilroy	Episode: "Ten Blocks on the Camino Real"
1966	Flipper	Philip Adams	Episode "Flipper and the Seal"
1967	The F.B.I.	Norman	Episode "The Dynasty"
1968	N.Y.P.D.	Fred Janney	Episode: "The Peep Freak"
1969	Mission: Impossible	Albert	Episode: "Live Bait"
1969	Then Came Bronson	Nick Oresko	Episode: "Pilot"
1969	Lancer	Andy Blake	Episode: "The Knot"
1970	Hawaii Five-O	Eddie Calhao	Episode "Cry, Lie"
1970	Ironside	Johnny	Episode "No Game for Amateurs"
1970	The F.B.I.	Perry	Episode "The Condemned"
1970	The Andersonville Trial	Captain Williams	Television film
1970	The Mod Squad	Danny Morgan	Episode S4 E12 "Real Loser"
1970	Hawaii Five-O	Arthur Dixon	Episode "Time and Memories"
1971	Montserrat	Antonanzas	Television film
1971	Goodbye, Raggedy Ann	Jules Worthman	Television film
1971	Mongo's Back in Town	Gordon	Television film
1972–1973	Cannon	Jerry Warton / Chris Hildebrandt	3 episodes
1972	The F.B.I.	Steve Chandler	Episode: "A Second Life"
1972	Mannix	Alex Lachlan	Episode: "To Kill A Memory"
1972	That Certain Summer	Gary McClain	Television film
1972	Pursuit	Timothy Drew	Television film
1973	Message To My Daughter	John Thatcher	Television film
1973	Ghost Story	Frank	Episode: "Dark Vengeance"
1973	The Streets of San Francisco	Dean Knox	Episode: "Betrayed"
1973	The FBI	Neil Harlan	Episode: "The Disinherited"
1973	Columbo	Karl Lessing	Episode: "Lovely but Lethal"
1974	The Story of Pretty Boy Floyd	Charles Arthur 'Pretty Boy' Floyd	Television film
1974	The Missiles of October	Robert F. Kennedy	Television film
1974	The Execution of Private Slovik	Eddie Slovik	Television film
1978	Taxi!!!	Taxi Driver	Television film
1979	Blind Ambition	John Dean	4 episodes
1979	Saturday Night Live	Himself, Host	Episode: "Martin Sheen/David Bowie"
1983	Kennedy	John F. Kennedy	3 episodes
1984	The Guardian	Charles Hyatt	Television film
1985	The Atlanta Child Murders	Chet Dettlinger	2 episodes
1985	Consenting Adult	Ken Lynd	Television film
1985	The Fourth Wise Man	Artaban	Television film
1986	News at Eleven	Frank Kenley	Television film
1986	Samaritan: The Mitch Snyder Story	Mitch Snyder	Television film
1987	Conspiracy: The Trial of the Chicago 8	James Marian Hunt	Television film
1990	Captain Planet and the Planeteers	Sly Sludge (voice)	seasons 1–3
1991	Guilty Until Proven Innocent	Harold Hohne	Television film
1992	The Last P.O.W.? The Bobby Garwood Story	William F. "Ike" Eisenbraun	Television film
1993	Alex Haley's Queen	James Jackson Sr.	3 episodes
1993	Murphy Brown	Nick Brody	Episode: "Angst for the Memories"
1993	Tales from the Crypt	Zorbin	Episode: "Well Cooked Hams"
1994	Roswell	Townsend	Television film
1994	One of Her Own	Assistant District Attorney Pete Maresca	Television film
1994–1996	Eyewitness	Narrator (U.S. version)	26 episodes
1996	The Crystal Cave: Lessons from the Teachings of Merlin	King Arthur	Television film
1996	Project ALF	Colonel Gilbert Milfoil	Television film
1997	The Simpsons	Sergeant Seymour Skinner	Voice; Episode: "The Principal and the Pauper"
1997	Hostile Waters	Aurora Skipper	Television film
1998	Babylon 5: The River of Souls	A Soul Hunter	Television film
1999	Total Recall 2070	Praxis	Episode: "Virtual Justice"
1999	Thrill Seekers	Grifasi	Television film
1999	LateLine	Himself	Guest star, Season 1, Episode 3: "The Seventh Plague"
1999–2006	The West Wing	President Josiah Bartlet	155 episodes
2002	Spin City	Ray Harris / Ray Crawford	Episode: "Rags to Riches"
2005	Two and a Half Men	Harvey	Episode: "Sleep Tight, Puddin' Pop"
2007	Studio 60 on the Sunset Strip	Radio Host	Uncredited voice; Episode: "K&R: Part 3"
2012–2014	Anger Management	Martin Goodson	20 episodes
2013	The Whale	Thomas Nickerson	Television film
2015–2022	Grace and Frankie	Robert Hanson	78 episodes
2016	L.M. Montgomery's Anne of Green Gables	Matthew Cuthbert	Television film
2017	Anne of Green Gables: The Good Stars	Matthew Cuthbert	Television film
2017	Anne of Green Gables: Fire & Dew	Matthew Cuthbert	Television film
2020	A West Wing Special to Benefit When We All Vote	President Josiah Bartlet	Recreation of "Hartsfield's Landing"
2024	Wild Cards	Joseph Edwards	Recurring character via archival footage

== Video games ==
Year	Game	Role	Notes
2010	Mass Effect 2	Illusive Man	Voice
2012	Mass Effect 3	Illusive Man	Voice

== Podcasts and radio ==
Year	Title	Role	Notes
2004–2013	A Prairie Home Companion	Wolf	12 episodes November 11, 2004 June 9, 2007 September 29, 2007 June 7, 2008 June 6, 2009 December 12, 2009 January 2, 2010 March 12, 2011 March 17, 2012 May 19, 2012 July 14, 2012 June 8, 2013
2017	The West Wing Weekly	Himself	Episode: "4.00: President Bartlet Special"
