= List of awards and nominations received by Martin Sheen =

List of Martin Sheen awards
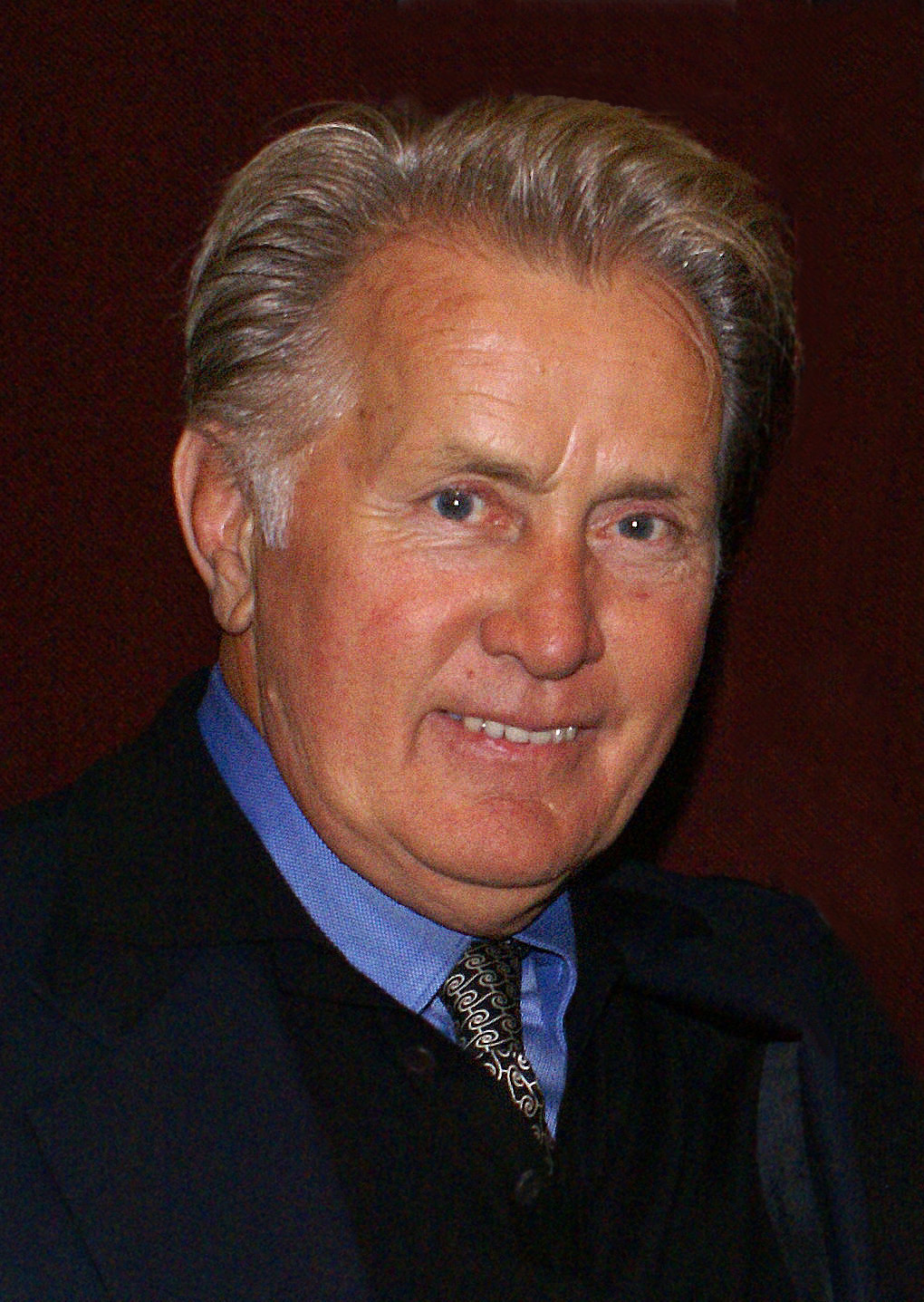
- Sheen in 2008
Award	Wins	Nominations
Golden Globe Award	1	8
Emmy Award	1	12
Overall	23	46

The following is a list of awards and nominations received by Martin Sheen

Sheen received numerous accolades throughout his acting career including a Golden Globe Award, two Daytime Emmy Awards, a Primetime Emmy Award, and four Screen Actors Guild Awards. He also received ten Primetime Emmy Award nominations including six for Outstanding Lead Actor in a Drama Series for his portrayal of President Jed Bartlet in the NBC series The West Wing which ran from 1999 to 2006.

He also received nominations for two BAFTA Awards for BAFTA Award for Best Actor for his role in the Francis Ford Coppola directed Vietnam War drama film Apocalypse Now (1979), and BAFTA TV Award for Best Actor for portraying John F. Kennedy in the NBC miniseries Kennedy (1984). He also was nominated for the Tony Award for Best Featured Actor in a Play for his role in The Subject Was Roses in 1965.

== Major associations ==
=== BAFTA Awards ===
British Academy Film Award
Year	Category	Nominated work	Result	Ref.
1980	Best Actor	Apocalypse Now	Nominated	
British Academy Television Award
1984	Best Actor	Kennedy	Nominated	

=== Emmy Awards ===
Daytime Emmy Awards
Year	Category	Nominated work	Result	Ref.
1981	Outstanding Performer in Religious Programming	Insight	Won	
1986	Outstanding Directing for Children's Programming	CBS Schoolbreak Special	Won	
1986	Outstanding Children's Special	CBS Schoolbreak Special	Nominated	
1989	Outstanding Children's Special	CBS Schoolbreak Special	Nominated	
Primetime Emmy Awards
1974	Best Lead Actor in a Drama	The Execution of Private Slovik	Nominated	
1978	Outstanding Lead Actor in a Drama or Comedy Special	Taxi!!!	Nominated	
1994	Outstanding Guest Actor in a Comedy Series	Murphy Brown (episode: "Angst for the Memories")	Won	
2000	Outstanding Lead Actor in a Drama Series	The West Wing	Nominated	
2001	Outstanding Lead Actor in a Drama Series	The West Wing	Nominated	
2002	Outstanding Lead Actor in a Drama Series	The West Wing	Nominated	
2003	Outstanding Lead Actor in a Drama Series	The West Wing	Nominated	
2004	Outstanding Lead Actor in a Drama Series	The West Wing	Nominated	
2006	Outstanding Lead Actor in a Drama Series	The West Wing	Nominated	
2006	Outstanding Guest Actor in a Comedy Series	Two and a Half Men (episode: "Sleep Tight, Puddin' Pop")	Nominated	

=== Golden Globe Awards ===
Year	Category	Nominated work	Result	Ref.
1968	Best Supporting Actor – Motion Picture	The Subject Was Roses	Nominated	
1979	Best Actor – Television Series Drama	Blind Ambition	Nominated	
1983	Best Actor – Miniseries or Television Film	Kennedy	Nominated	
1999	Best Actor – Television Series Drama	The West Wing	Nominated	
2000	Best Actor – Television Series Drama	The West Wing	Won	
2001	Best Actor – Television Series Drama	The West Wing	Nominated	
2002	Best Actor – Television Series Drama	The West Wing	Nominated	
2003	Best Actor – Television Series Drama	The West Wing	Nominated	

=== Screen Actors Guild Awards ===
Year	Category	Nominated work	Result	Ref.
1999	Outstanding Male Actor in a Drama Series	The West Wing	Nominated	
2000	Outstanding Ensemble in a Drama Series	The West Wing	Won	
2000	Outstanding Male Actor in a Drama Series	The West Wing	Won	
2001	Outstanding Ensemble in a Drama Series	The West Wing	Won	
2001	Outstanding Male Actor in a Drama Series	The West Wing	Won	
2002	Outstanding Ensemble in a Drama Series	The West Wing	Nominated	
2002	Outstanding Male Actor in a Drama Series	The West Wing	Nominated	
2003	Outstanding Ensemble in a Drama Series	The West Wing	Nominated	
2003	Outstanding Male Actor in a Drama Series	The West Wing	Nominated	
2004	Outstanding Ensemble in a Drama Series	The West Wing	Nominated	
2005	Outstanding Ensemble in a Drama Series	The West Wing	Nominated	
2006	Outstanding Cast in a Motion Picture	The Departed	Nominated	
2006	Outstanding Cast in a Motion Picture	Bobby	Nominated	

=== Tony Awards ===
Year	Category	Nominated work	Result	Ref.
1965	Best Featured Actor in a Play	The Subject Was Roses	Nominated	

== Honorary accolades ==
Award	Category	Result
Career Awards
Imagen Foundation Awards—Lifetime Achievement Award—1998
Nosotros Golden Eagle Awards—Lifetime Achievement Award—2000
Nosotros Golden Eagle Awards—Lifetime Achievement Award—2001
Star on the Walk of Fame—1500 Vine Street—August 22, 1989

== Miscellaneous awards ==
Award	Category	Result
Apocalypse Now (1979)
American Movie Award—Marquee	Best Actor	Nominated
The Guardian (1984)
CableACE Award—ACE	Actor in a Movie or Miniseries	Nominated
Cadence (1990)
Deauville Film Festival—Critics Award	—N/a	Nominated
The War at Home (1996)
ALMA Award	Outstanding Individual Performance in a Crossover Role in a Feature Film	Nominated
Hostile Waters (1997)
ALMA Award	Outstanding Individual Performance in a Made-for-Television Movie or Mini-Series in a Crossover Role (Also for Medusa's Child)	Nominated
Medusa's Child (1997)
ALMA Award	Outstanding Individual Performance in a Made-for-Television Movie or Mini-Series in a Crossover Role (Also for Hostile Waters)	Nominated
Monument Ave. (1998)
ALMA Award	Outstanding Actor in a Feature Film in a Crossover Role	Nominated
Babylon 5: The River of Souls (1998)
ALMA Award	Outstanding Individual Performance in a Made-for-Television Movie or Mini-Series in a Crossover Role	Nominated
The West Wing (1999-2006)
ALMA Award	Outstanding Actor in a Drama Series—2000	Nominated
ALMA Award	Outstanding Actor in a Television Series—2001	Won
ALMA Award	Outstanding Actor in a Television Series—2002	Nominated
The Departed (2006)
COFCA Award	Best Ensemble (with Anthony Anderson, Mark Wahlberg, Vera Farmiga, Jack Nicholson, Leonardo DiCaprio, Matt Damon, Ray Winstone, Alec Baldwin)	Won
Bobby (2006)
Critics' Choice Award	Best Acting Ensemble (with Joy Bryant, Christian Slater, Harry Belafonte, Mary Elizabeth Winstead, William H. Macy, Nick Cannon, Sharon Stone, Ashton Kutcher, Demi Moore, Jacob Vargas, Heather Graham, Laurence Fishburne, Shia LaBeouf, Elijah Wood, Lindsay Lohan, Anthony Hopkins, Helen Hunt, Freddy Rodríguez, Svetlana Metkina	Nominated
