= Martin Sheen =

American actor (born 1940)

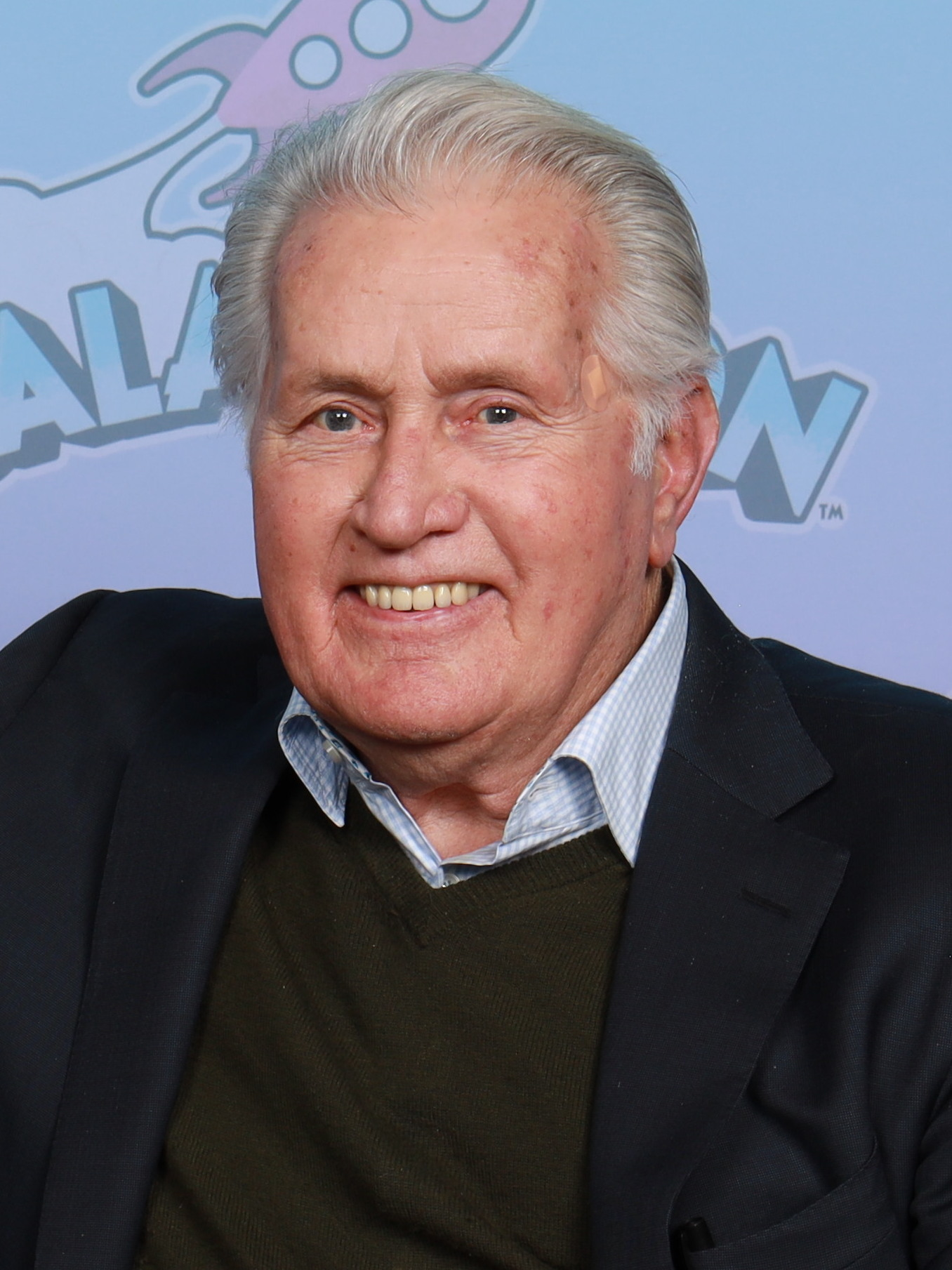
- Sheen at GalaxyCon Richmond in 2025
- Born: Ramón Antonio Gerardo Estévez; August 3, 1940 (age 86); Dayton, Ohio, U.S.
- Citizenship: United States; Spain; Ireland
- Occupation: Actor
- Years active: 1961–present
- Works: Full list
- Political party: Democratic
- Spouse: Janet Templeton (m. 1961)
- Children: Emilio Estevez; Ramon Estevez; Charlie Sheen; Renée Estevez
- Relatives: Joe Estevez (brother)
- Family: Estevez
- Awards: Full list
- Martin Sheen's voice from the BBC programme Desert Island Discs, April 3, 2011

Ramón Antonio Gerardo Estévez (born August 3, 1940), known professionally as Martin Sheen, is an American actor. His work spans more than six decades of television and film, and his accolades include three Emmy Awards, a Golden Globe Award, and four Actor Awards. In 1989, he received a star on the Hollywood Walk of Fame. In 2025, The Independent ranked Sheen as the greatest actor never to have been nominated for an Academy Award.

Sheen was nominated for a Tony Award for Best Featured Actor in a Play for his breakthrough performance in The Subject Was Roses (1964). He later starred in its 1968 film adaptation, which earned him a Golden Globe Award nomination. He achieved further recognition for his roles in Terrence Malick's crime drama Badlands (1973) and Francis Ford Coppola's Vietnam War drama Apocalypse Now (1979), the latter earning him a nomination for the BAFTA Award for Best Actor in a Leading Role. His other notable films include Catch-22 (1970), The Little Girl Who Lives Down the Lane (1976), Gandhi (1982), The Dead Zone (1983), Wall Street (1987), Gettysburg (1993), The American President (1995), Catch Me If You Can (2002), The Departed, Bobby (both 2006), The Way (2010), The Amazing Spider-Man (2012), and Judas and the Black Messiah (2021).

Sheen received the Primetime Emmy Award for Outstanding Guest Actor in a Comedy Series for his role in Murphy Brown (1994), and later received widespread acclaim portraying President Josiah "Jed" Bartlet in The West Wing (1999–2006), for which he received six nominations for the Primetime Emmy Award for Outstanding Lead Actor in a Drama Series tying the record for most nominations without a win in the category. His other work in television includes roles such as Eddie Slovik in The Execution of Private Slovik (1974), Robert F. Kennedy in The Missiles of October (1974), Michael McCord in The California Kid (1974), John Dean in Blind Ambition (1979), and John F. Kennedy in Kennedy (1983). He later played Robert Hanson in the Netflix series Grace and Frankie (2015–2022).

Born and raised in the United States by a Spanish father and an Irish mother, he adopted the stage name Martin Sheen to help him gain acting parts. He is the father of four children, all of whom are actors. Sheen has directed one film, Cadence (1990), in which he appears alongside his sons Charlie and Ramón. He has narrated, produced, and directed documentary projects and has been active in liberal politics.

== Early life and education ==
Sheen was born in Dayton, Ohio, on August 3, 1940, to Francisco Estévez Martínez (1898–1974) and Mary-Ann née Phelan (1903–1951). During birth, Sheen's left arm was crushed by forceps, giving him limited lateral movement of that arm (Erb's palsy) and resulting in the arm being three inches (8 cm) shorter than his right arm. Both of Sheen's parents were immigrants; his father was Spanish, from Salceda de Caselas, Galicia, and his mother was Irish, from Borrisokane, County Tipperary. After moving to Dayton in the 1930s, his father became a factory worker/machinery inspector at the National Cash Register Company. Sheen's maternal uncle, Michael Phelan, fought in the Irish Civil War as a volunteer in the Anti-Treaty Irish Republican Army, and was imprisoned in Kilmainham Gaol, Dublin. Sheen grew up on Brown Street in the South Park neighborhood, the seventh of ten children (nine boys and a girl). Due to his father's work, the family lived for a time on the island of Bermuda, where five of his brothers were born. Martin was the first child to be born in Dayton, after the family's return. Sheen contracted polio as a child and had to remain bedridden for a year. His doctor's treatment using Sister Kenny's method helped him regain use of his legs.

When Sheen was ten years old, his mother died, and the children faced the possibility of living in an orphanage or foster homes. The family was able to remain together with the assistance of the Holy Trinity Catholic Church in Dayton. Raised as a Catholic, he graduated from Chaminade High School (now Chaminade Julienne Catholic High School). At fourteen years old he organized a strike of golf caddies while working at a private golf club in Dayton, Ohio. He complained about the golfers, saying: "They often used obscene language in front of us ... we were little boys and they were abusive ... anti-Semitic .... And they, for the most part, were upstanding members of the community."

Sheen was drawn to acting at a young age, but his father disapproved of his interest in the field. Despite his father's opposition, Sheen borrowed money from a Catholic priest and moved to New York City in his early twenties, hoping to make it as an actor. He spent two years in the Living Theatre company. It was in New York that he met Catholic activist Dorothy Day. Working with her Catholic Worker Movement, he began his commitment to social justice, and later went on to play Peter Maurin, cofounder of the Catholic Worker Movement, in Entertaining Angels: The Dorothy Day Story. Sheen deliberately failed the entrance examination for the University of Dayton so that he could pursue his acting career.

He adopted his stage name, Martin Sheen, from a combination of the CBS casting director Robert Dale Martin, who gave him his first big break, and Catholic archbishop and broadcaster Fulton J. Sheen. In a 2003 Inside the Actors Studio interview, Sheen explained,

Whenever I would call for an appointment, whether it was a job or an apartment, and I would give my name, there was always that hesitation and when I'd get there, it was always gone. So I thought, I got enough problems trying to get an acting job, so I invented Martin Sheen. It's still Estevez officially. I never changed it officially. I never will. It's on my driver's license and passport and everything. I started using Sheen, I thought I'd give it a try, and before I knew it, I started making a living with it and then it was too late. In fact, one of my great regrets is that I didn't keep my name as it was given to me. I knew it bothered my dad.

== Career ==
=== 1963–1979: Rise to prominence ===
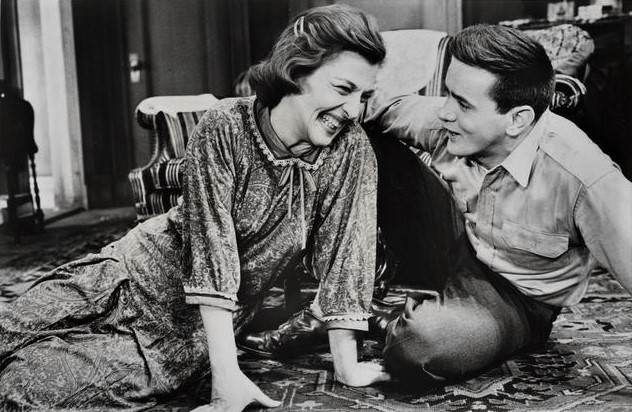
Sheen with Irene Dailey in the stage play The Subject Was Roses in 1965

Sheen was greatly influenced by the actor James Dean. Speaking of the impact Dean had on him, Sheen stated, "All of his movies had a profound effect on my life, in my work and all of my generation. He transcended cinema acting. It was no longer acting, it was human behavior." Sheen developed a theatre company with other actors in hopes that a production would earn him recognition. In 1963, he made an appearance in "Nightmare", an episode of the television science fiction series The Outer Limits. In 1964, he co-starred in the Broadway play The Subject Was Roses; he later reprised his role in the 1968 film of the same name, and was nominated for a Golden Globe Award for Best Supporting Actor. Sheen also starred in the television production Ten Blocks on the Camino Real (1966), an adaptation of Tennessee Williams' play Camino Real directed by Jack Landau and presented by NET, a PBS predecessor. In 1968, he played the titular role in Hamlet, directed by Joseph Papp at The Public Theater, with dialogue mostly in English and some in Spanish as Hamlet's alter ego.

During the 1960s and early 1970s Sheen appeared as a guest star in many popular television series, including Insight (1960s–1980s), My Three Sons (1964), Flipper (1967), The F.B.I. (1968), Mission: Impossible (1969), Hawaii Five-O (1970), Dan August (1971), The Rookies, Columbo, and The Streets of San Francisco (all 1973). He also had a recurring role as Danny Morgan in Mod Squad (1970–1971). By the early 1970s, Sheen was increasingly focusing on television films and motion pictures. He portrayed Dobbs in the 1970 film adaptation of Catch-22. He then co-starred in the controversial Emmy Award-winning 1972 television film That Certain Summer, said to be the first television movie in America to portray homosexuality in a sympathetic light.

His next important feature film role was in 1973 when he starred with Sissy Spacek in the crime drama Badlands, playing an antisocial multiple murderer. Sheen has stated that his role in Badlands was one of his two favorites, the other being his role as a U.S. Army special operations officer in Apocalypse Now. Also in 1973, Sheen appeared opposite David Janssen in "Such Dust As Dreams Are Made On", the first pilot for the television series Harry O. In 1974, Sheen portrayed a hot rod driver in the television film The California Kid and that same year received an Emmy Award nomination for Best Actor in a television drama for his portrayal of Pvt. Eddie Slovik in the television film The Execution of Private Slovik. Based on an incident that occurred during World War II, the film told the story of the only U.S. soldier to be executed for desertion since the American Civil War.

Sheen's performance led to Francis Ford Coppola's casting him in a lead role as U.S. Army Captain Benjamin L. Willard in 1979's Apocalypse Now, gaining him wide recognition. Filming in the Philippine jungle in the typhoon season of 1976, Sheen later said that he was not in good physical condition and was drinking heavily. For the film's opening sequence in a Saigon hotel room, Sheen's portrayal of Willard as heavily intoxicated was aided by Sheen's celebrating his 36th birthday on-set that day, and being actually drunk. Twelve months into filming, Sheen suffered a minor heart attack and had to crawl out to a road for help. While he was recovering, his younger brother Joe Estevez stood in for him in a number of long shots and in some of the voice-overs. Sheen was able to resume filming a few weeks later. In 1976, he participated in The Little Girl Who Lives Down the Lane as Frank Hallet, the antagonist with bad intentions towards teenager protagonist Rynn Jacobs (Jodie Foster). Frank was the son of landlady Cora Hallet (Alexis Smith). In 1979, Sheen acted in The Final Countdown with Kirk Douglas, another actor with family connections to Bermuda (Diana Dill, Douglas's first wife and the mother of their sons Michael Douglas and Joel Douglas was a Bermudian).

=== 1980–1998: Established actor ===
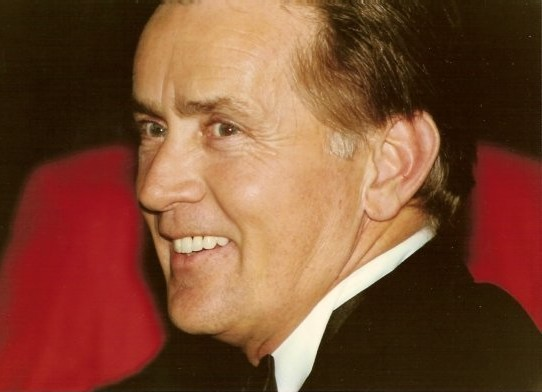
Sheen at the 1990 Cannes Film Festival

In the early 1980s he had roles in the science fiction war film The Final Countdown (1980), the biographical epic Gandhi (1982), the sports drama That Championship Season (1982), and the drama film Wall Street (1987) starring Michael Douglas, and his son Charlie Sheen. He played Captain Hollister in Firestarter (1984) opposite Drew Barrymore and David Keith.

Sheen portrayed U.S. President John F. Kennedy in the miniseries Kennedy (1983) for which he received nominations for the British Academy Television Award for Best Actor and the Golden Globe Award for Best Actor – Miniseries or Television Film. He also portrayed Attorney General Robert F. Kennedy in the television special The Missiles of October (1974), White House Chief of Staff A.J. McInnerney in The American President (1995), White House Counsel John Dean in the television mini-series Blind Ambition (1979) for which he was nominated for the Golden Globe Award for Best Actor – Television Series Drama. In 1991 he narrated the Oliver Stone biographical film JFK (1991).

Other roles include the sinister would-be president Greg Stillson in The Dead Zone, the President in the Lori Loughlin-Chris Noth television mini-series, Medusa's Child, the president in the short film Family Attraction. In 1993, Sheen's sympathetic portrayal of General Robert E. Lee in the Ronald Maxwell film Gettysburg (1993) met with acclaim. Sheen has performed voice-over work as the narrator for the Eyewitness series in the US for the first and second seasons and as the "real" Seymour Skinner in the controversial Simpsons episode "The Principal and the Pauper".

=== 1999–2006: The West Wing ===
Sheen played fictional Democratic president Josiah "Jed" Bartlet in the NBC television drama, The West Wing. For his performance he earned a Golden Globe Award for Best Actor – Television Series Drama in 2000 and was nominated six times for the Primetime Emmy Award for Outstanding Lead Actor in a Drama Series.

During this time he played Roger Strong in Steven Spielberg's crime film Catch Me If You Can (2002), Captain Oliver Queenan in Martin Scorsese's crime film The Departed (2006), and Jack Stevens in the biographical film Bobby (2006). He was nominated for a Primetime Emmy Award for Outstanding Guest Actor in a Comedy Series for his role in Two and a Half Men in 2005. He also appeared in the sitcom Spin City in 2002 and in Studio 60 on the Sunset Strip (2007).

=== 2007–present ===
Sheen played the role of the Illusive Man in the video game Mass Effect 2, and the sequel, Mass Effect 3. In addition, he voiced the role of Emilio in the English language version of the 2011 animated film Arrugas (Wrinkles).

In 2009, Sheen travelled to Mexico City to star in Chamaco with Kirk Harris, Alex Perea, Gustavo Sánchez Parra and Michael Madsen. Sheen appeared in Martin Scorsese's The Departed as Captain Oliver Queenan, a commanding officer who is watching an undercover cop (Leonardo DiCaprio). Sheen and his son Ramon Estevez combined both their real and stage names to create the Warner Bros.-affiliated company, Estevez Sheen Productions. In November 2010, Sheen was cast as Uncle Ben in Sony's 2012 reboot of the Spider-Man film series, The Amazing Spider-Man, directed by Marc Webb.

In 2010 the company released The Way, written and directed by Sheen's son Emilio Estevez, who also stars in the film. (Martin's daughter Renée also has a part in the film.) Martin plays an American doctor, whose son, played by Estevez, dies while hiking the Camino de Santiago. Driven by sadness, Martin's character leaves his Californian life and embarks on the 800 km (500 mi) pilgrimage from the French Pyrenees to Spain's Santiago de Compostela, taking his son's ashes with him. The Way premiered at the 2010 Toronto International Film Festival.

In 2010, Sheen filmed Stella Days in County Tipperary, Ireland, near the birthplace of his mother. Thaddeus O'Sullivan directed and Irish actor Stephen Rea starred, along with IFTA award-winning actress Amy Huberman. Sheen plays parish priest Daniel Barry, whose love of movies leads him to help set up a cinema in Borrisokane.

In 2016, Sheen starred in the film The Vessel, performing his role in both the English- and Spanish-language versions.

Sheen played a starring role in Netflix's Grace and Frankie (2015–2022). In December 2019 Sheen signed on to play legendary FBI director J. Edgar Hoover alongside Lakeith Stanfield, Jesse Plemons, and Daniel Kaluuya in Judas and the Black Messiah. Produced by Warner Bros. Pictures, the film was released in 2021. It was directed by Shaka King and chronicles the assassination of Black Panther Party leader Fred Hampton in Chicago on December 4, 1969.

In October 2025, he launched a podcast together with his daughter Renée.

== Activism ==
Sheen has been active in numerous nonviolent acts of civil disobedience, and has been arrested 66 times demonstrating for numerous liberal causes. Although he did not attend college in his youth, Sheen credited the Marianists at University of Dayton as a major influence on his public activism, as well as Archbishop Desmond Tutu. Sheen is known for his outspoken support of liberal political causes, such as opposition to United States military actions and a hazardous-waste incinerator in East Liverpool, Ohio. Sheen has dismissed calls for him to run for office, saying: "There's no way that I could be the President. You can't have a pacifist in the White House ... I'm an actor. This is what I do for a living." Sheen is an honorary trustee of the Dayton International Peace Museum.

He supported the 1965 farm worker movement with Cesar Chavez in Delano, California. Sheen endorsed marches and walkouts called by the activist group By Any Means Necessary (BAMN) to force the State of California to introduce a holiday in memory of Cesar Chavez. On the day of the protests (March 30), thousands of students, primarily Latino ones from California and elsewhere, walked out of school in support of the demand. Sheen has said he also participated in the large-scale immigration marches in Los Angeles in 2006 and 2007.

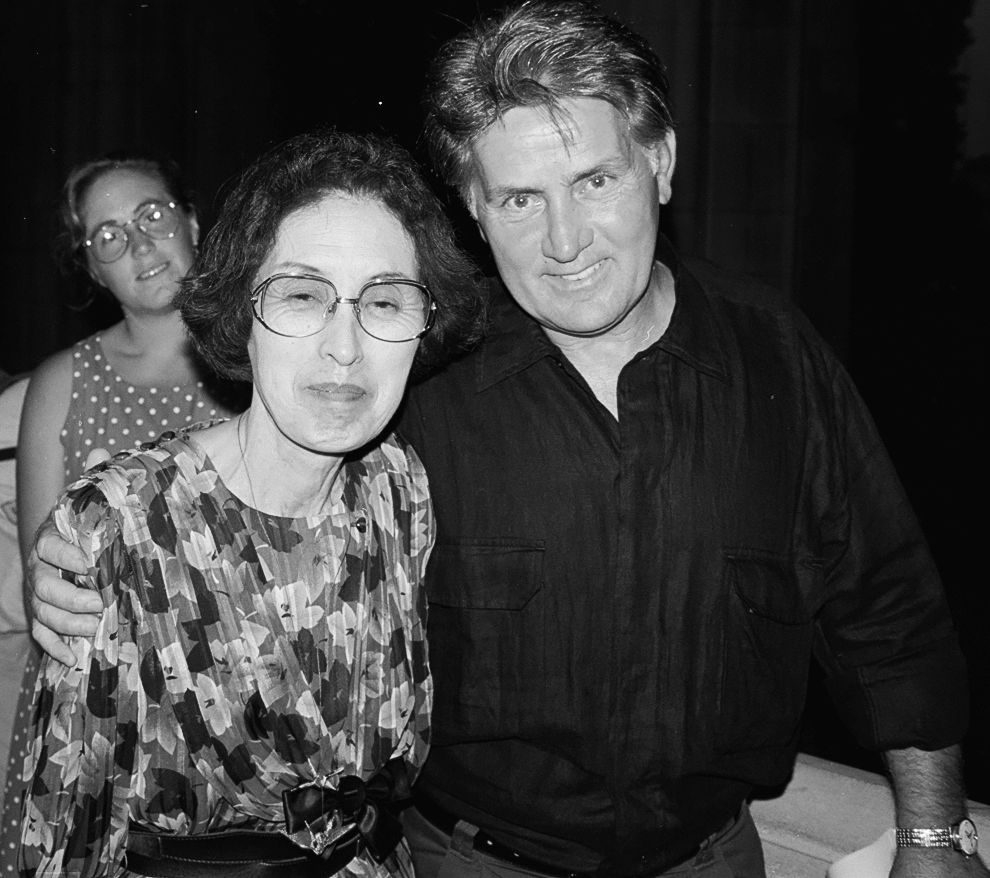
Sheen with a Hiroshima bombing survivor, 1995

According to W. James Antle III, writing in The American Conservative, Sheen is a follower of the consistent life ethic, which opposes abortion, euthanasia, capital punishment and war. Sheen articulated his view in an interview with The Progressive: "I'm inclined to be against abortion of any life. But I am equally against the death penalty or war." He also stated at the same occasion: "I personally am opposed to abortion, but I will not judge anybody else's right in that regard because I am not a woman and I could never face the actual reality of it." He also supports the Democrats for Life of America's Pregnant Women Support Act.

Sheen starred in Jakov Sedlar's religious drama Gospa in 1995. He also narrated several movies for the Croatian director during the 1990s.

In 1988, he was arrested outside the Israeli Defense Ministry offices in New York during a 30-minute rally protesting America's military alliance with Israel and condemning "the Israeli government's policies in the West Bank and Gaza Strip."

Sheen and Paul Watson (from the non-profit environmental organization Sea Shepherd Conservation Society) were confronted on May 16, 1995, by a number of Canadian sealers in a hotel on Magdalen Islands over Sea Shepherd's history of attacks on sealing and whaling ships. Sheen negotiated with the sealers while Watson was escorted to the airport by police. Sheen became involved with gun control in 2000 after the National Shooting Sports Foundation hired his politically conservative brother, actor Joe Estevez who sounds like Sheen, to do a voice-over for a pro-gunmaker commercial earlier in the year.

In 1997, Sheen volunteered his time to narrate the documentary film An Act of Conscience, which follows war tax resisters Randy Kehler and Betsy Corner, who, as a protest against war and military spending, openly refused to pay their federal income taxes, prompting the Internal Revenue Service (IRS) to seize their house.

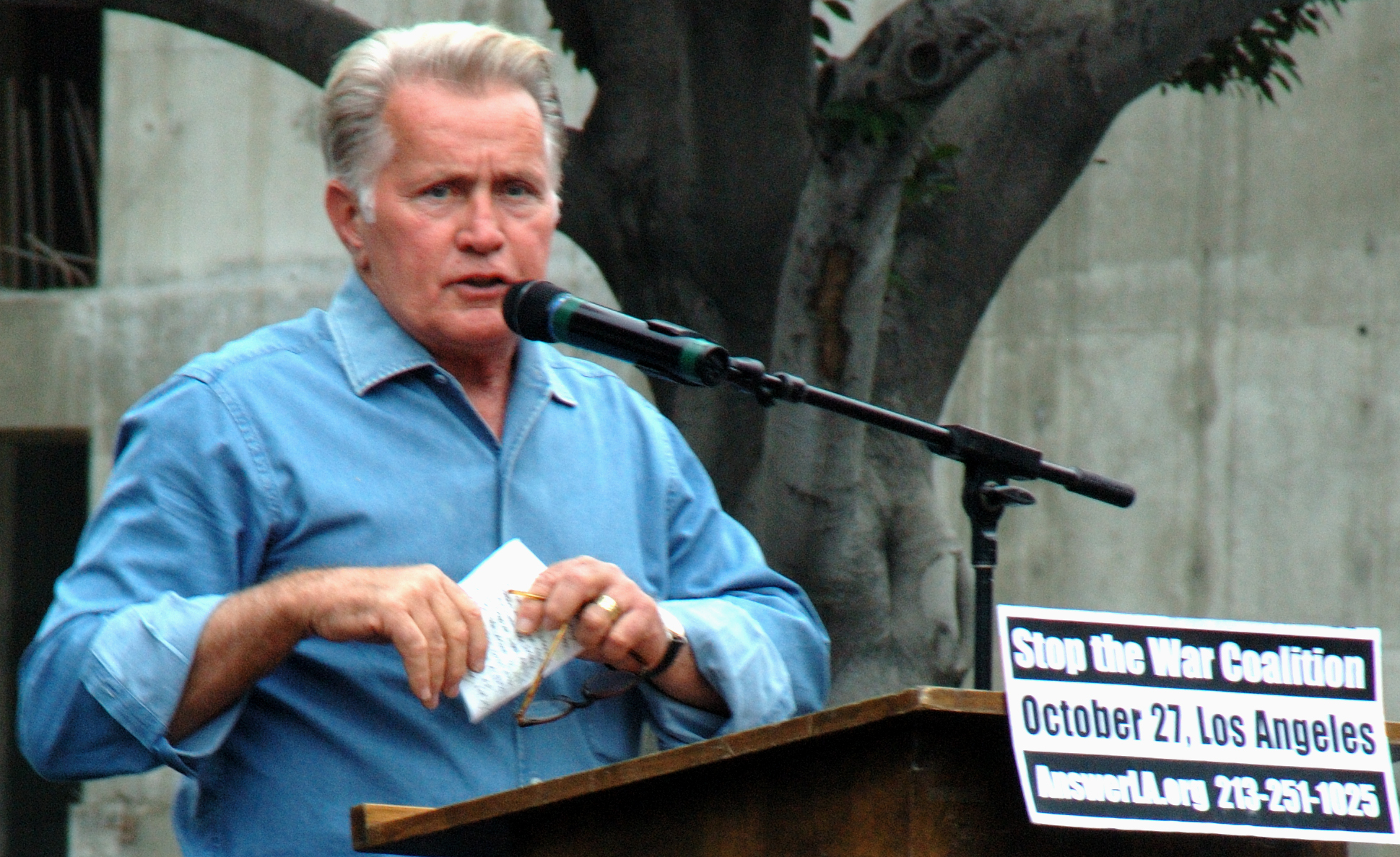
Sheen at an anti-war protest in October 2007

In early 2003, Sheen signed the "Not in My Name" declaration opposing the invasion of Iraq (along with prominent figures such as Noam Chomsky and Susan Sarandon); the declaration appeared in the magazine The Nation. Sheen visited Camp Casey on August 28, 2005, to pray with anti-Iraq War activist Cindy Sheehan, who had demanded a second meeting with U.S. President George W. Bush. Addressing Sheehan's supporters, Sheen said: "At least you've got the acting president of the United States", referring to his role as president Josiah Bartlet on The West Wing.

During the 1980 Democratic Party presidential primaries, he supported Senator Ted Kennedy and gave multiple speeches supporting him in Florida. Sheen endorsed Democratic presidential candidate Jesse Jackson in the 1988 presidential election. Sheen campaigned for Vice President Al Gore in the 2000 presidential election.

Sheen campaigned with Rob Reiner for Democratic presidential candidates Howard Dean and John Kerry in 2004. Members of the Democratic Party in Ohio reportedly contacted Sheen in 2006 to persuade him to run for the United States Senate. Sheen declined the offer, stating, "I'm just not qualified. You're mistaking celebrity for credibility." In the 2008 U.S. presidential election, Sheen initially endorsed New Mexico Governor Bill Richardson and helped raise funds for his campaign. After Richardson dropped out of the campaign, Sheen supported Barack Obama.

In 2006, when Sheen was living in Ireland as a result of his enrollment in NUI Galway, he criticized Irish mushroom farmers for exploiting foreign workers by paying them as little as €2.50 an hour—way below the country's minimum wage of €7.65.

From 2008 to 2013, Sheen's activism included attendance at meetings of the environmentalist group Earth First! and speaking appearances at youth empowerment events called We Day on behalf of Free the Children, an international charity and educational partner. Sheen has been named an ambassador of Free The Children and has supported such initiatives as the We are Silent campaign, a 24-hour pledge of silence. Speaking about his work with Free The Children, Sheen has said, "I'm hooked! I told them whenever I could offer some insight or energy or whatever I had, I'd be delighted if they would call on me, and they have." Sheen championed Help Darfur Now, a student-run organization to help aid victims of the genocide in Darfur, the western region in Sudan. He also appeared in the 2009 anti-fur documentary Skin Trade.

Also in 2009, while walking the Camino de Santiago while filming the 2010 movie The Way, Sheen met Gary and Elizabeth Jewson, a married couple from Australia who had lost their 18-year-old daughter Melanie in a car accident in 2004. Inspired by the touching story of Melanie's ambitions prior to her untimely death, Sheen became a patron of the foundation when it launched in 2012, and it has since raised more than A$250,000 for helping serve Vanuatu's under-resourced health and education systems.

Sheen appeared in television and radio ads urging Washington state residents to vote "no" on Initiative 1000, a proposed assisted suicide law before voters in the 2008 election.

Sheen first spoke to 18,000 young student activists at Free The Children's 2010 We Day. "While acting is what I do for a living, activism is what I do to stay alive," he said.

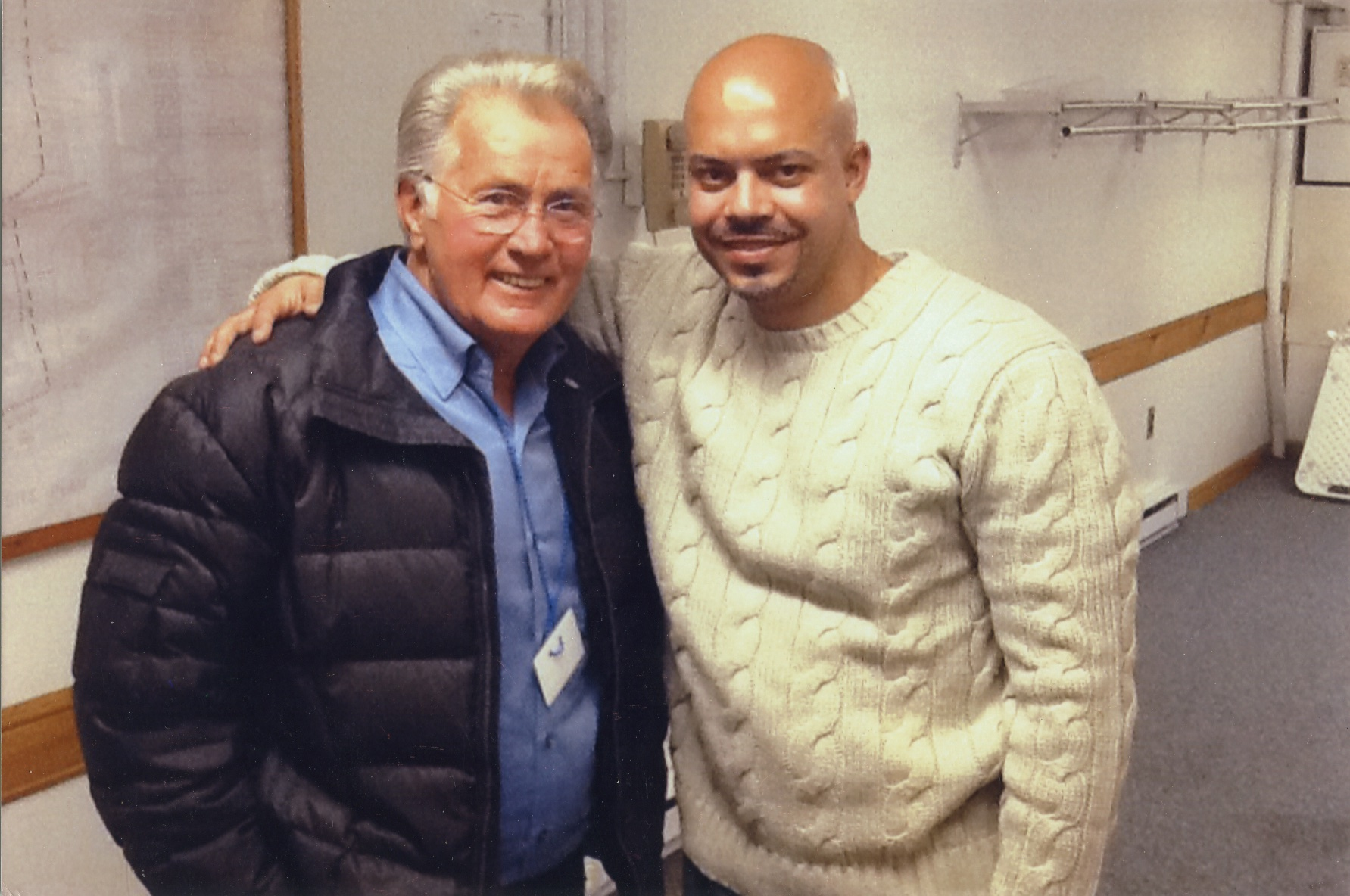
Sheen with Jon-Adrian Velazquez in Sing Sing Prison, 2011

On December 5, 2011, at Sing Sing Correctional Facility, Sheen met with Jon-Adrian Velazquez, now a legal reform activist who was wrongfully convicted for a 1998 murder of a retired police officer in Harlem. Velazquez was serving 25 years to a life prison sentence. Later that day, Sheen held a press conference at a Manhattan courthouse for Velazquez, advocating for his release. Sheen stated that the case "cries out for justice". After meeting Velazquez, Sheen said that it "confirmed my belief that Jon-Adrian Velazquez is an innocent man".

In March 2012, Sheen and George Clooney performed in Dustin Lance Black's play 8—a staged reenactment of the federal trial that overturned California's Prop 8 ban on same-sex marriage—as attorney Theodore Olson. The production was held at the Wilshire Ebell Theatre and broadcast on YouTube to raise money for the American Foundation for Equal Rights. On March 30, 2012, the Screen Actors Guild (SAG) and the American Federation of Television and Radio Artists (AFTRA) completed a merger of equals forming a new union SAG-AFTRA. As a result of this merger, a group of actors including Sheen, fellow voice actors Michael Bell, Clancy Brown, Wendy Schaal, her former stepmother Valerie Harper, and other actors including former SAG President Edward Asner, Ed Harris, and Nancy Sinatra immediately sued against the current SAG President Ken Howard and several SAG Vice Presidents to overturn the merger and separate the (now merged) two unions because of their claims that the election was improper. The plaintiffs dropped their lawsuit several months later.

Sheen reunited with the cast of The West Wing in September 2012 to produce a video explaining Michigan's ballot and its partisan and nonpartisan sections. The video doubled as a campaign ad for Bridget McCormack, who was running as a nonpartisan candidate for Michigan's Supreme Court. McCormack's sister, actress Mary McCormack, co-starred with Sheen on The West Wing in its final three seasons.

Sheen wrote a foreword to Mark Lane's autobiography, Citizen Lane (2012). He has credited Lane's book Rush to Judgment (1966) with having "inspired my own thoughts of activism and thus changed my life". When the film Bhopal: A Prayer for Rain premiered in 2014, Sheen advocated for Amnesty International's campaign Justice for Bhopal.

Sheen narrated the trailer for a proposed documentary film about the prosecution of former Alabama governor Don Siegelman in 2015.

Sheen narrated the feature-length documentary film based on the Peter Navarro book Death by China, released in 2012. The documentary was financed by Nucor steel corporation, and has been endorsed by Donald Trump.

Sheen donated $1,000 to Irish political party Sinn Féin.

== Political views ==
In a speech at Oxford University in 2009, Sheen stated that he had been arrested 66 times for protesting and acts of civil disobedience. He was described by human rights activist Craig Kielburger as having "a rap sheet almost as long as his list of film credits."

On April 1, 2007, Sheen was arrested, with 38 other activists, for trespassing at the Nevada Test Site at a Nevada Desert Experience event protesting against the site.

He has a long association with the marine conservation organization Sea Shepherd, which has named a ship, the RV Martin Sheen, after him to recognize his commitment and support.

In a 2011 interview with RTÉ, Sheen stated that his wife was conceived through rape, and if her mother had aborted her, or dumped her in the Ohio River as she had considered, his wife would not exist. He also noted that three of his grandchildren were conceived out of wedlock, saying his sons "were not happy at the time but they came to love these children. We have three grown grandchildren, two of them are married, they're some of the greatest source [sic] of joy in our lives."

He has called himself a "very liberal life-long Democrat." He supported Joe Biden in the 2024 Democratic Party presidential primaries.

== Personal life ==
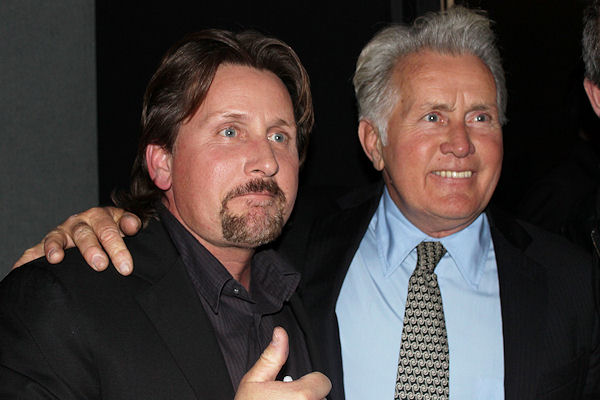
Sheen with son Emilio Estevez at the BFI premiere of his film The Way in London February 2011

=== Family ===
Sheen married Janet Templeton on December 23, 1961, and they have three sons and a daughter, all of whom are now actors: Emilio, Ramón, Carlos (who changed his name to Charlie Sheen), and Renée.

He has played the father of sons Emilio and Charlie in various projects: he played Emilio's father in The War at Home, In the Custody of Strangers and The Way, and Charlie's father in Wall Street, No Code of Conduct, two episodes of Spin City, and Anger Management. He also appeared as a guest star in one episode of Two and a Half Men playing the father of Charlie's neighbor Rose (Melanie Lynskey), and another as guest star Denise Richards' father. Martin also played a "future" version of Charlie in a Visa commercial. Martin has played other characters with his children. He starred in the film Bobby, which was directed by Emilio, who also starred in the movie alongside his father. Renée had a supporting role in The West Wing, as a White House staff secretary. Emilio also appeared, uncredited, in an episode of The West Wing portraying his father's character, President Bartlet, in home-movie footage. He also appears in a cameo in the film Hot Shots! Part Deux, reprising his role in Apocalypse Now! with his son, Charlie Sheen.

Sheen became a grandfather at age 43 when Emilio had a son with his girlfriend, Carey Salley. Sheen has a total of ten grandchildren and two great-grandchildren.

In 2012, Sheen was a guest on the American version of Who Do You Think You Are?, tracing his Irish and Galician ancestry.

He underwent a quadruple heart bypass operation in December 2015.

Sheen and his wife Janet evacuated from their home during the Woolsey Fire in 2018. Their son Charlie Sheen briefly lost contact with them and put out a call on Twitter for information on how to get in touch: a KTTV reporter later tracked them down at the staging grounds on Zuma Beach, where Sheen offered assurances to his children that they were fine. Although at the time Sheen believed the house was lost, he later confirmed the house was spared from the fire.

=== Academic pursuits ===
After the end of filming of The West Wing, Sheen planned to further his education: "My plan is to read English literature, philosophy and theology in Galway, Ireland, where my late mother came from and where I'm also a citizen." Speaking after an honorary arts doctorate was conferred on him by the National University of Ireland, Sheen joked that he would be the "oldest undergraduate" at the National University of Ireland (NUI), Galway, when he started his full-time studies there in the autumn of 2006. Although expressing concern that he might be a "distraction" to other students at NUI Galway, he attended lectures like everyone else. Speaking the week after filming his last episode of The West Wing, he said, "I'm very serious about it." He once said, "I never went to college when I was young and am looking forward to giving it a try... at age 65!" On September 1, 2006, Sheen was among the first to register as a student at NUI Galway, where he took classes in English literature, philosophy, and oceanography.

Sheen maintains links with Galway and "heartily" supported Michael D. Higgins (himself an alumnus of NUI Galway) in the 2011 Irish presidential election, having become a "dear friend" of Higgins while studying there.

=== Religious and political beliefs ===
Sheen is Catholic, having had his faith restored during conversations in Paris in 1981 with Terrence Malick, director of Sheen's breakthrough film, Badlands (1973). Sheen stated in a 1983 interview with The Varsity that he is a Catholic on a "spiritual level" and that he "couldn't care less about religion". Sheen also stated that he believed in reincarnation. In an interview in 2023, Sheen said how important is the practice of his Catholic faith in his life: "... I loved the Sacraments – Confession and the Eucharist and the Mass were of utmost importance to me. I reunited with that, and I found myself". He is a supporter of the Catholic Worker Movement.

Sheen has described himself as "an extremely liberal Catholic." He is a supporter of the LGBTQ community and called an amendment to the Michigan constitution banning same-sex marriage "outrageous" in 2007. He is anti-war and is the most arrested celebrity in Hollywood, having been arrested over 60 times for protesting multiple issues, such as environmental issues and human rights abuse.

Sheen has identified himself as pro-life, noting that his wife was born as a result of rape. In 2003 he stated "I personally am opposed to abortion, but I will not judge anybody else's right in that regard because I am not a woman and I could never face the actual reality of it." He has lent his support to the Democrats for Life of America's Pregnant Women Support Act, an act that offered support to pregnant mothers to provide them with an alternative to abortion.

== Filmography ==
Sheen has worked with a wide variety of film directors, including Richard Attenborough, Francis Ford Coppola, Terrence Malick, David Cronenberg, Mike Nichols, Martin Scorsese, Steven Spielberg, and Oliver Stone.

== Awards and honors ==
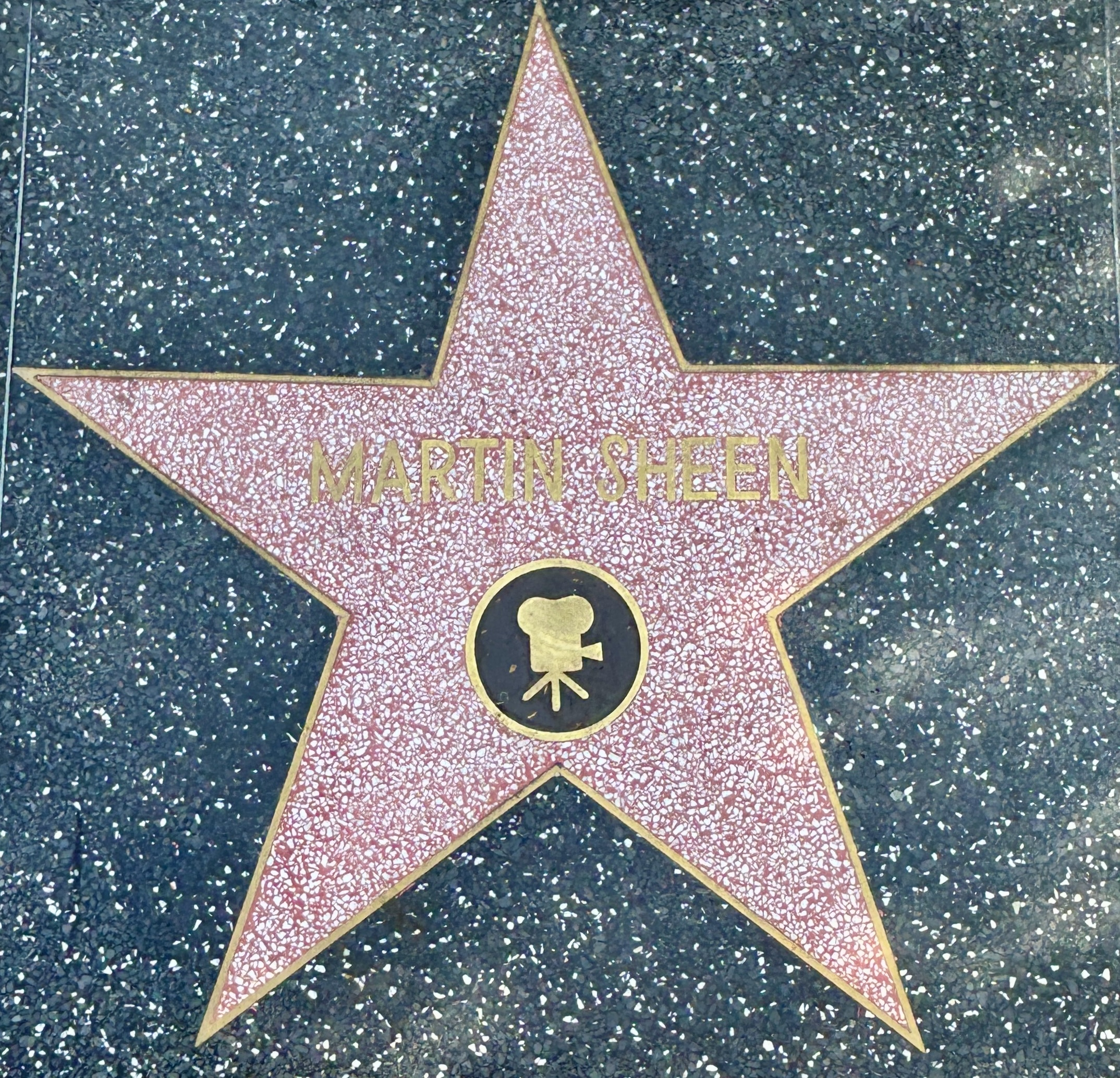
Hollywood Walk of Fame star

In film, Sheen has won the Best Actor award at the San Sebastián International Film Festival for his performance as Kit Carruthers in Badlands. Sheen's portrayal of Capt. Willard in Apocalypse Now earned a nomination for the BAFTA Award for Best Actor. In television, Sheen has won a Golden Globe and two Actor Awards for the role of President Josiah Bartlet in The West Wing, and an Emmy for guest starring in the sitcom Murphy Brown. Sheen received a star on the Hollywood Walk of Fame in 1989.

In the spring of 1989, Sheen was named honorary mayor of Malibu, California. He promptly marked his appointment with a decree proclaiming the area "a nuclear-free zone, a sanctuary for aliens and the homeless, and a protected environment for all life, wild and tame". Some local citizens were angered by the decree, and the Malibu Chamber of Commerce met in June of that year to consider revoking his title, but voted unanimously to retain him.

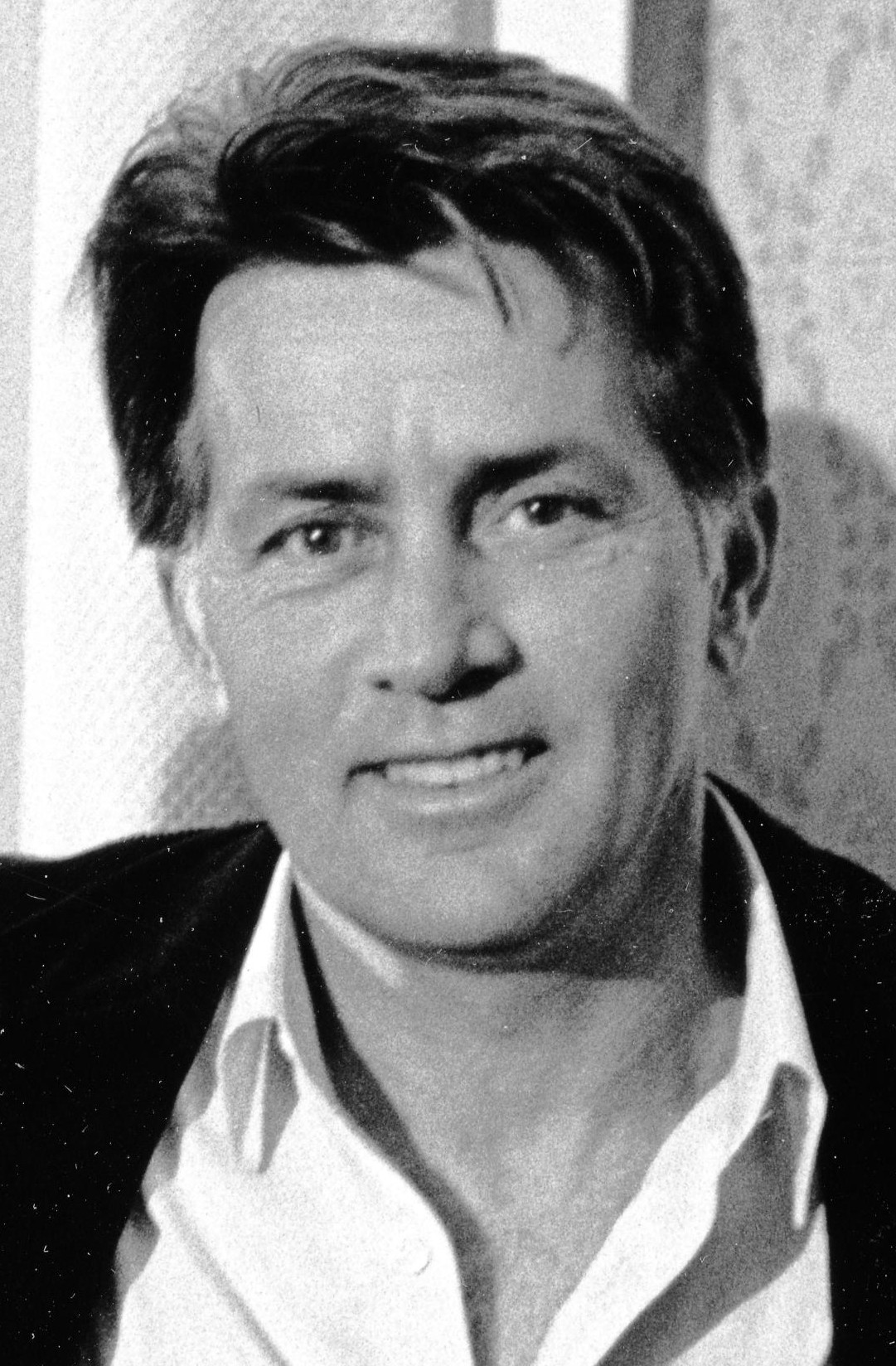
Sheen in 1987

While Sheen claims he deliberately failed the entrance exam for the University of Dayton so that he could pursue his acting career, he still has an affinity for UD, and is seen drinking from a "Dayton Flyers" coffee mug during several episodes of The West Wing. Sheen also developed an ongoing relationship with Wright State University, where he performed Love Letters as a benefit for scholarships in the Department of Theatre, Dance and Motion Pictures, and hosted a trip of donors to the set of The West Wing with the department's chair, W. Stuart McDowell, in September 2001. The Sheen/Estevez & Augsburger Scholarship Fund has since attracted more than $100,000 in scholarships in the arts for students in need at WSU since its inception in 2000. Sheen also has a great affinity for the University of Notre Dame and in 2008 was awarded the Laetare Medal, the highest honor bestowed on American Catholics, in May 2008 at the school's commencement.

Sheen received six Emmy Award nominations for Outstanding Lead Actor in a Drama Series for his performance on The West Wing, for which he won a Golden Globe Award for Best Performance by an Actor in TV-Drama, as well as two SAG Awards for Outstanding Performance by a Male Actor in a Drama Series, and was part of the cast that received two SAG Awards for Outstanding Performance by an Ensemble in a Drama Series.

In his acting career, Sheen has been nominated for ten Emmy Awards, winning one. He has also earned eight nominations for Golden Globe Awards. Sheen has a star on the Hollywood Walk of Fame, at 1500 Vine Street.

In 2001 Sheen won a TV Guide Award for 'Actor of the Year in a Drama Series' for The West Wing. In the animated Nickelodeon movie, TV show and TV spin-off of The Adventures of Jimmy Neutron, there is a character named Sheen Estevez, which is Sheen's original last name – Estévez – and working last name, Sheen.

Sheen was the 2003 recipient of the Marquette University Degree of Doctor of Letters, honoris causa for his work on social and Catholic issues. In 2011, he was awarded an honorary life membership in the Law Society of University College Dublin. On May 3, 2015, Sheen received an honorary Doctor of Human Letters degree from the University of Dayton for his lifelong commitment to peace, social justice and human rights exemplifying the Catholic, Marianist university's missions. On May 6, 2023, Loyola Marymount University conferred an honorary Doctor of Humane Letters, honoris causa, upon Sheen for symbolizing in an "outstanding" manner a record of "service that contributes to the public good," for his "significant contributions to igniting a brighter world," and for serving as an "exemplar" of "Catholic, Jesuit, and Marymount traditions".

== See also ==
- List of peace activists
