= Chamaco =

Chamaco is a masculine given name. Notable people with the name include:

- Chamaco Ramirez (1941–1983), Puerto Rican singer and composer
- Chamaco Rivera (born 1946), Puerto Rican singer and composer
- Chamaco Valaguez (born 1957), Mexican wrestler
