= Papa's Got a Brand New Baghdad =

Live album by The Capitol Steps
- Released: June 8, 2004
- Recorded: 2003 and 2004
- Genre: Comedy
- Length: 55:59
- Label: Self-published
- Producer: Elaina Newport

The Capitol Steps chronology
Between Iraq and a Hard Place	Papa's Got a Brand New Baghdad	Four More Years in the Bush Leagues

Professional ratings
Review scores
Source	Rating
Allmusic	4.5/5 stars

Papa's Got a Brand New Baghdad is a 2004 album by the Capitol Steps.

== Track listing ==
1. Green Green Grass at Home
2. Help Rwanda
3. Ain't No Surplus, Now It's Gone
4. Democratic Hit Parade
5. I Wish I Was on Oxycontin
6. Hillary's Way
7. Cameroon
8. Papa's Got a Brand New Baghdad
9. Spider Hole
10. I Want a Guy Just Like the Guy Who Married Dear Old Dad
11. Kobe Bryant Jewelers
12. Frogs at War
13. Goodbye, Uday, Qusay
14. Cows Gone Mad
15. SuperCaliforniaRecallFreakShowWasAtrocious
16. The Fondler
17. Lirty Dies

"Papa's Got a Brand New Baghdad". Amazon.
