= Four More Years in the Bush Leagues =

Live album

Live album by The Capitol Steps
- Released: July 12, 2005
- Recorded: 2004 and 2005
- Genre: Comedy
- Length: 61:51
- Label: Self-published
- Producer: Elaina Newport

The Capitol Steps chronology
Papa's Got a Brand New Baghdad	Four More Years in the Bush Leagues	I'm So Indicted

Professional ratings
Review scores
Source	Rating
AllMusic	4.5/5 stars

Four More Years in the Bush Leagues is a 2005 album by the Capitol Steps.

== Track listing ==
1. Embraceable Jew
2. Wouldn't It Be Hillary?
3. The Sunni Side of Tikrit
4. Someone Dumber Might
5. I Like Big Cuts and I Cannot Lie
6. There is Nothing Like Ukraine
7. Fakey Purple Hearts
8. I've Taken Stands on Both Sides Now
9. The Candidates' Debate
10. Der Nadermouth
11. It Don't Mean a Thing if Your State's Not a Swing
12. Electile Dysfunction
13. He Works Hard for the Country
14. If I Only Had a Plan
15. The Impossible Dean
16. Sunni & Cher
17. The Land's Not Your Land
18. Detective Story
19. The Supremes
20. Lirty Dies: Yubble-Doo, Bot Nush, Startha Moowurt, and Rill O'Beilly

== Songs parodied ==
In album order:

1. Embraceable You
2. Wouldn't It Be Loverly
3. On the Sunny Side of the Street
4. Summer Nights
5. Baby Got Back
6. There is Nothing Like a Dame
7. Achy Breaky Heart
8. Both Sides Now
9. 'O Sole Mio
10. It Don't Mean a Thing
11. She Works Hard for the Money
12. If I Only Had a Brain
13. The Impossible Dream
14. I Got You Babe
15. This Land Is Your Land
16. Stayin Alive

New lyrics by Bill Strauss, Elaina Newport and Mark Eaton

== Production personnel ==
- Producer: Elaina Newport
- Director: Bill Strauss
- Sound Engineers: Jim Smith and Greg Hammon
- Pianists: Howard Breitbart, Eileen Cornett, Dave Kane, Marc Irwin, Emily Bell Spitz and Lenny Wiliams
- Cassettes and CDs pressed by Lion Recording
