= When Bush Comes to Shove =

Live album by The Capitol Steps
- Released: July 2, 2002
- Recorded: 2001 and 2002
- Genre: Comedy
- Length: 54:13
- Label: Self-published
- Producer: Elaina Newport

The Capitol Steps chronology
One Bush, Two Bush, Old Bush, New Bush	When Bush Comes to Shove	Between Iraq and a Hard Place

Professional ratings
Review scores
Source	Rating
AllMusic	4/5 stars
Variety	

When Bush Comes to Shove is a 2002 album by the Capitol Steps.

== Track listing ==
1. Shoe-Bomb
2. Don't Go Faking You're Smart
3. Enron-Ron-Ron
4. Tom Ridge Bedtime Story #1
5. Taliban
6. Pack the Knife
7. Mr. Greenspan
8. Dr. Tommy Tuck
9. Everybody Must Get Cloned
10. Tony With the Light Brown Hair
11. Who'll Drop a Bomb During Ram-A-Dan-A-Dan?
12. Jacques Chirac
13. Osama Come Out Tomorrow
14. Old Man Wizard
15. Con-Did-It
16. Tom Ridge Bedtime Story #2
17. You Don't Mess Around With Jim
18. Cher the Power
19. India Oh India
20. Argentina
21. Moooooooo
22. Tom Ridge Bedtime Story #3
23. Glory, Paranoia
24. Lirty Dies: Schmenron and Obama Sin Laden
