= I'm So Indicted =

Live album by Capitol Steps
- Released: July 11, 2006
- Recorded: 2005 and 2006
- Genre: Comedy
- Length: 67:34
- Label: Self-published
- Producer: Elaina Newport

Capitol Steps chronology
Four More Years in the Bush Leagues	I'm So Indicted	O Christmas Bush

Professional ratings
Review scores
Source	Rating
Allmusic	4.5/5 stars

I'm So Indicted is a 2006 album by the Capitol Steps.

== Track listing ==
1. Here's to You, Reverend Robertson
2. George Bush speaks
3. I'm So Indicted
4. What a Difference Delay Makes
5. Three Little Kurds from School
6. Government Lessons for Little Children: Chicken Little
7. Can't Get to a Church
8. GOP-BS
9. Sam Alito
10. In the Metro
11. How Do You Solve a Problem Like Korea?
12. Rolling Kidney Stones (A collection including Angioplasty, I've got a bald spot and I want to paint it black, You can't always eat what you want, and Hey; You; Get off of my lawn. "Jumping Hot Flash", "Time is not on my side" and "Blood, Sugar")
13. Dubai Dubai Doo
14. This is the House that Jack Bribed
15. FU Airlines
16. Living Will
17. Old Finger
18. Rafael Palmeiro's Greatest Hits
19. John Bolton Goes to the U.N.
20. Michael Brown
21. Deep Throat
22. When I'm 84
23. God Bless My S.U.V.
24. Lirty Dies: Ecret Sagents, Ack Jabramoff, Chick Daney, Yubble-Doo and the Storrible Horm

== Songs parodied ==
In album order:

1. Mrs. Robinson
2. (spoken word)
3. I'm So Excited
4. What a Difference a Day Made
5. Three Little Maids From School (from Gilbert and Sullivan's The Mikado)
6. (spoken word)
7. Get Me to the Church on Time
8. Sesame Street Theme, Bye Bye Blackbird (GOP-BS)
9. Mona Lisa
10. In the Ghetto
11. Maria
12. Angie, Paint it Black, You Can't Always Get What You Want, "Get Off of My Cloud", A Little Help From My Friends (Rolling Kidney Stones)
13. Strangers in the Night
14. (spoken word)
15. Snowbird
16. (spoken word)
17. Goldfinger
18. Lookin' For Love, I Shot the Sheriff, Time in a Bottle, Itsy Bitsy Teenie Weenie Yellow Polka Dot Bikini (Rafael Palmeiro's greatest Hits)
19. (spoken word)
20. Charlie Brown
21. (spoken word)
22. When I'm 64
23. God Bless the USA
24. (spoken word)

New lyrics by Bill Strauss, Elaina Newport and Mark Eaton, with Bari Biern and Janet Davidson Gordon for "Old Finger", Mike Tilford for "Deep Throat" and Michael Forrest for "Can't Get To a Church."

== Production personnel ==
- Producer: Elaina Newport
- Director: Bill Strauss
- Sound Engineers: Jim Smith and Greg Hammon
- Pianists: Howard Breitbart, Eileen Cornett, Dave Kane, Marc Irwin, Emily Bell Spitz and Lenny Wiliams
- Cassettes and CDs pressed by Lion Recording
