= We Arm the World =

Live album by Capitol Steps
- Released: 1985
- Recorded: 1985
- Genre: Comedy
- Label: Self-published

Capitol Steps chronology
Capitol Steps Live! at the Shoreham	We Arm the World	Thank God I'm A Contra Boy

Professional ratings
Review scores
Source	Rating
AllMusic	3/5 stars

We Arm The World is a 1985 album by the Capitol Steps.

== Track listing ==
1. Getting To The Dirge
2. Gorby Gorbachev
3. You Write Up My Wife
4. Home, Sweet Home / Hello, Vitaly
5. When I'm 62 / Keep a COLA
6. Deficit Discounters
7. Dutch The Magic Reagan
8. Perfect Present Residents / Ronald "R" Superstar
9. Meet the Press
10. Tax Lite
11. Stock Man
12. Nice Work
13. Mamas, Don't Let Your Babies Grow Up To Be Yuppies
14. Saab Story
15. 'Crats
16. We Arm the World
