= Capitol Steps =

American political satire comedy troupe

The Capitol Steps
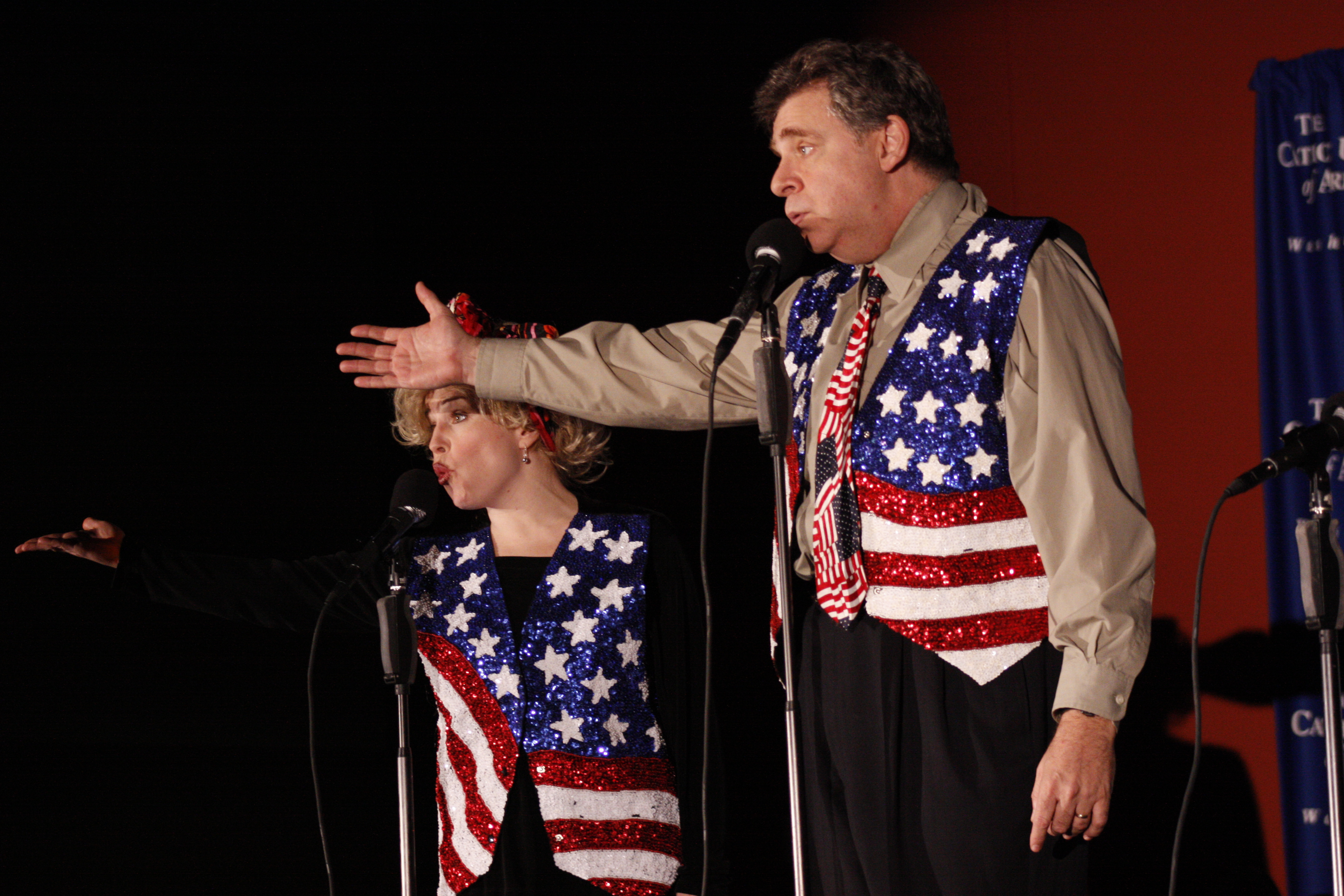
- A 2008 performance

Comedy career
- Years active: 1981–2021
- Medium: Television, theatre, radio, audio recordings
- Genre: Satire
- Subjects: American politics, Washington, D.C., the U.S. federal government
- Members: Full list
- Website: www.capsteps.com

The Capitol Steps was an American political-satire group that performed from 1981 to 2020. Most of the Capitol Steps' material parodied well-known contemporary songs and famous poems. As the Washington Post described their show in its first article about them 1984, "Along with a few cheap props and some quickie theater, the Steps poke fun at current political events by changing the lyrics to well-known songs. 'E-I-E-I-O,' for example, becomes 'E-R-E-R-A...Edgar Allan Poe's 'The Raven' is now 'The Reagan,' quothing 'cut some more.''" Beginning in the late 1980s, they also added a spoonerism routine called "Lirty Dies" near the end of each performance with innuendoes about recent scandals. They released over 40 albums, primarily song parodies. Originally consisting of congressional staffers, the troupe was later primarily made up of professional actors and singers. The Capitol Steps have performed on PBS, public radio and in small- and medium-size venues around the United States. On January 13, 2021, the Capitol Steps announced via Twitter that they were shutting down after 39 years of performing.

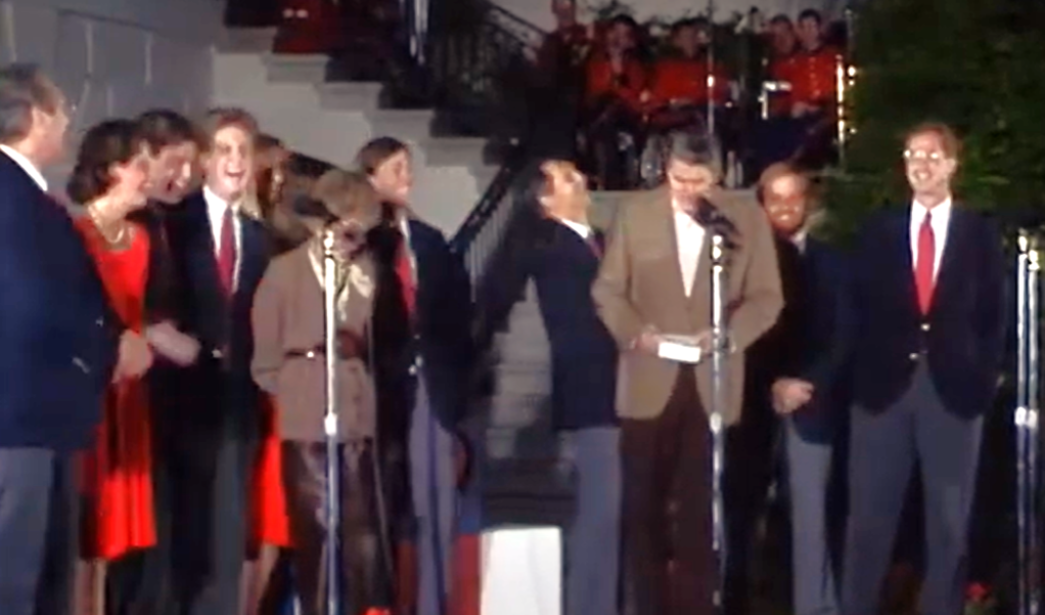
The Capitol Steps with President and Mrs. Reagan at the White House - September 15, 1988

== Reagan years ==
In 1981, Republican congressional staffers Bill Strauss, Elaina Newport, and Jim Aidala used their spare time at the Subcommittee on Energy, Nuclear Proliferation, and Government Processes of the Senate Committee of Governmental Affairs to write and sing parodies of current events. They were originally assisted in writing by Senate Foreign Relations Committee staffer, Christopher Manion. Joined on stage by fellow Republican Senate staffers Nancy Baskin, Barbie Granzow, and Dave Nichols, they decided on a Christmas show as their first performance while continuing to work full-time as congressional staffers. They chose "The Capitol Steps" as their group name because of news earlier that year that Congressman John Jenrette had had sex with his wife, Rita, on the steps of the Capitol Building.

Their first show was the Foreign Relations Committee's December 11,1981 Christmas party. The performers considered the show a success, and were invited to perform the same songs several more times that month. In 1982, the group expanded to include House staffers and Democrats. Despite being predominantly Republican, they tried to make their shows bipartisan with a roughly-even mix of songs lampooning Democrats and Republicans.

Although the group attracted media interest at the time, they refused interview requests out of concern that their jobs could be endangered by press coverage and their behavior might damage Strauss, Newport & Aidala's subcommittee chair Charles H. Percy. They also censured the topics they would sing about in their early days. As Capitol Steps member Suzanne Curley told the Washington Post at the time, "if one of us has a problem with their individual office about a particular song, then we don't do it."

A complementary pass to a Capitol Steps show at the Shoreham Hotel ca. 1983

In February 1983, the Capitol Steps began to perform monthly at the Shoreham Hotel and became open to publicity for the first time. They received a favorable article in The Washington Post, and their performances were successful. The early show was built around President Ronald Reagan. As Bill Strauss told the Washington Post at the time, "With Reagan, the issues are more clearly defined. He's easy to satirize." In November 1984, they performed at Percy's election-night party; during the party they learned that the senator had lost the election, and that Strauss, Newport and Aidala would lose their jobs with him. Shortly afterwards, the Capitol Steps became a professional group and recorded their first album: Capitol Steps Live! at the Shoreham.

After Percy's loss, Strauss decided to work full-time for the Capitol Steps. Newport went to work for Sen. Al D'Amato. Aidala went to work at the US Environmental Protection Agency. At this time, the group included David Gencarelli, Richard Paul, Anne Hill, Ann Schmitt, Brian Ash, and Mike Loomis (all except Loomis and Gencarelli were still with the group in 2012 with Newport).

By this time, the group was performing weekly at the Shoreham. They would later move to The Bread Oven at 1201 Pennsylvania Avenue, near the White House. In the fall of 1986, the Capitol Steps began performing on a regular basis at Chelsea's Cabaret in the Georgetown area. When Chelsea's closed, they moved to the Ronald Reagan Building and International Trade Center.

In September 1988, the Capitol Steps performed at the White House for an audience that included President Ronald Reagan, his wife Nancy, and hundreds of members of Congress. The president enjoyed the show.

The Capitol Steps released five albums during Reagan's two presidential terms, including Thank God I'm A Contra Boy, We Arm the World, and Workin' 9 to 10.

== George H. W. Bush years ==
The Capitol Steps with Vice President George H. W. Bush and Mrs. Bush in May, 1986.

The Capitol Steps had performed twice for President Bush when he was Vice President -- at his office's Christmas party in 1987, and at an intimate dinner party in the Vice President's Residence in 1989. During the Bush Years, they continued to perform material that included international and foreign policy affairs (such as the United States invasion of Panama) and prominent gaffes (such as George Herbert Walker Bush's recognition of September 7 as Pearl Harbor Day). The group became known for parodying Vice President Dan Quayle, particularly after Quayle's infamous correction of a child's spelling of "potato" by telling him to add a final -e.

The Capitol Steps logo from the early 1990s

The Capitol Steps released six albums during the elder Bush's presidency, including Stand By Your Dan, 76 Bad Loans, and Georgie on My Mind, and performed several times at the White House. On several occasions, the president requested that the group sing songs poking fun at himself.

== Clinton years ==
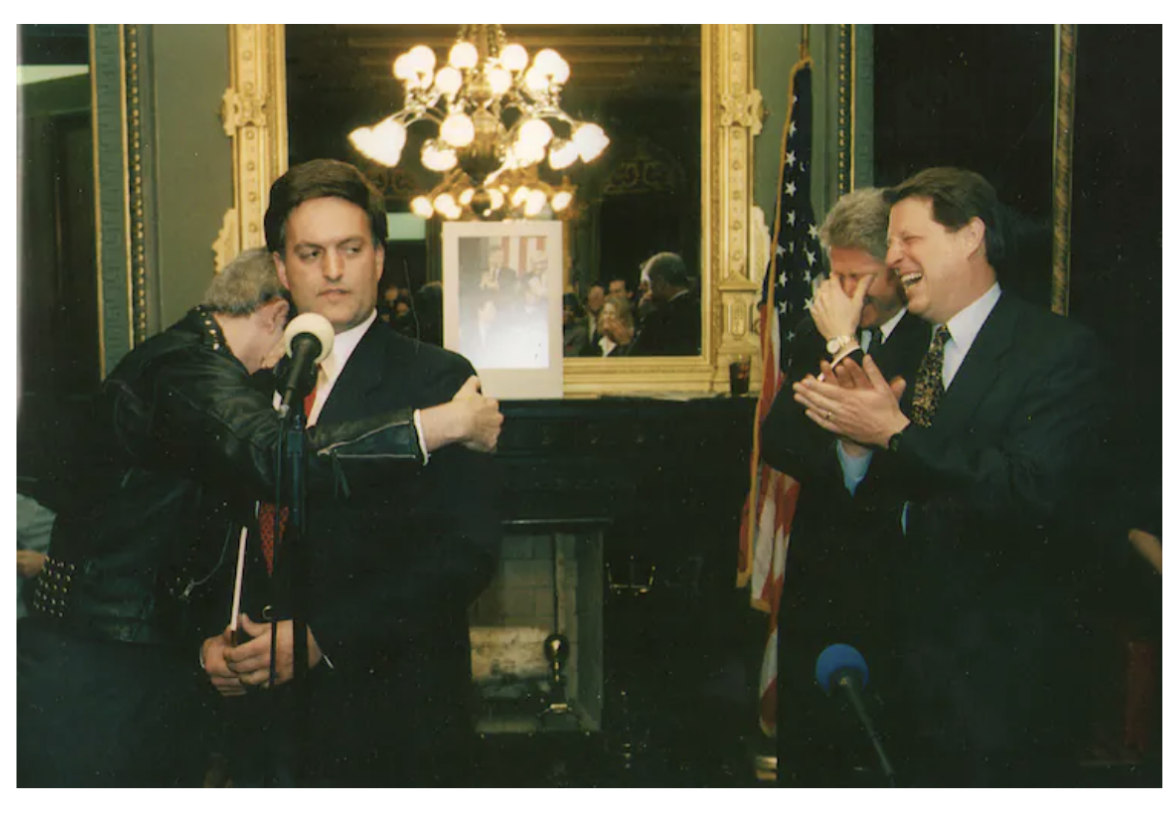
President Clinton and Vice President Gore watch the Capitol Steps perform at Gore's 48th birthday party - March 31, 1996

For the first five years of the Clinton Administration, the Capitol Steps had difficulty finding material about the President for their show. That changed after the Lewinsky scandal happened. As Elaina Newport told The New York Times, "The pace of that first week (after Lewinsky) was pretty wild. One day the prop man was racing out to get a black beret, the next it was the ponytail of her old drama teacher in Oregon, the next it was presidential' knee pads." Before Lewinsky, the group had focused on First Lady Hillary Clinton; Vice-President Al Gore; and Surgeon General Joycelyn Elders, who had suggested that masturbation could be a useful part of a comprehensive sex-education curriculum.

In 1994, the Capitol Steps performed at the Executive Office Building for Vice President Gore's 48th birthday party. President Clinton and Vice President Gore both attended.

== George W. Bush Years ==
The 2000 presidential election yielded the pre-election "I Want a Brand New Pair of Candidates" and several other songs about the aborted recount.

The Capitol Steps album "Four More Years in the Bush Leagues"

The popular impression of George W. Bush's intellect, fed by his frequent grammatical errors in speeches, allowed the Capitol Steps to reuse much of their old Dan Quayle material. Immediately after the events of September 11, 2001, jokes aimed at the president or American politics no longer seemed appropriate to the general public. The group cancelled most of their performances for the next several weeks. The group soon found new material that people would find funny in October 2001. They poked fun at the improved national view of Bush and at figures who were becoming more relevant to the American public, including New York Mayor Rudy Giuliani, British Prime Minister Tony Blair, and French President Jacques Chirac.

Heightened security nationwide soon became a popular subject for the Capitol Steps and other comedians in the wake of media reports that travelers were being questioned in airports for having powdered sugar from a donut on their clothing.

In 2002 and 2003, their material lampooned SUVs and their drivers, Hans Blix, the collapse of Enron, the standoff with Saddam Hussein, Condoleezza Rice, Democratic hopefuls for the 2004 presidential nomination, the capture of Saddam Hussein, same-sex weddings, the Kobe Bryant trial, and the California gubernatorial recall election (in which they reused "The Fondler"—a Clinton-era parody of "The Wanderer"—with Arnold Schwarzenegger as the target). Since 2004 the Capitol Steps have remained topical with their parodies, releasing songs about the marriage of Prince Charles and Camilla Parker Bowles, U.S. immigration-reform-law proposals, and the Tom DeLay scandals.

On December 18, 2007, group co-founder and principal writer Bill Strauss died at his home in McLean, Virginia of pancreatic cancer.

After Strauss's death, Newport wrote songs primarily with Capitol Steps member Mark Eaton.

== Obama years ==
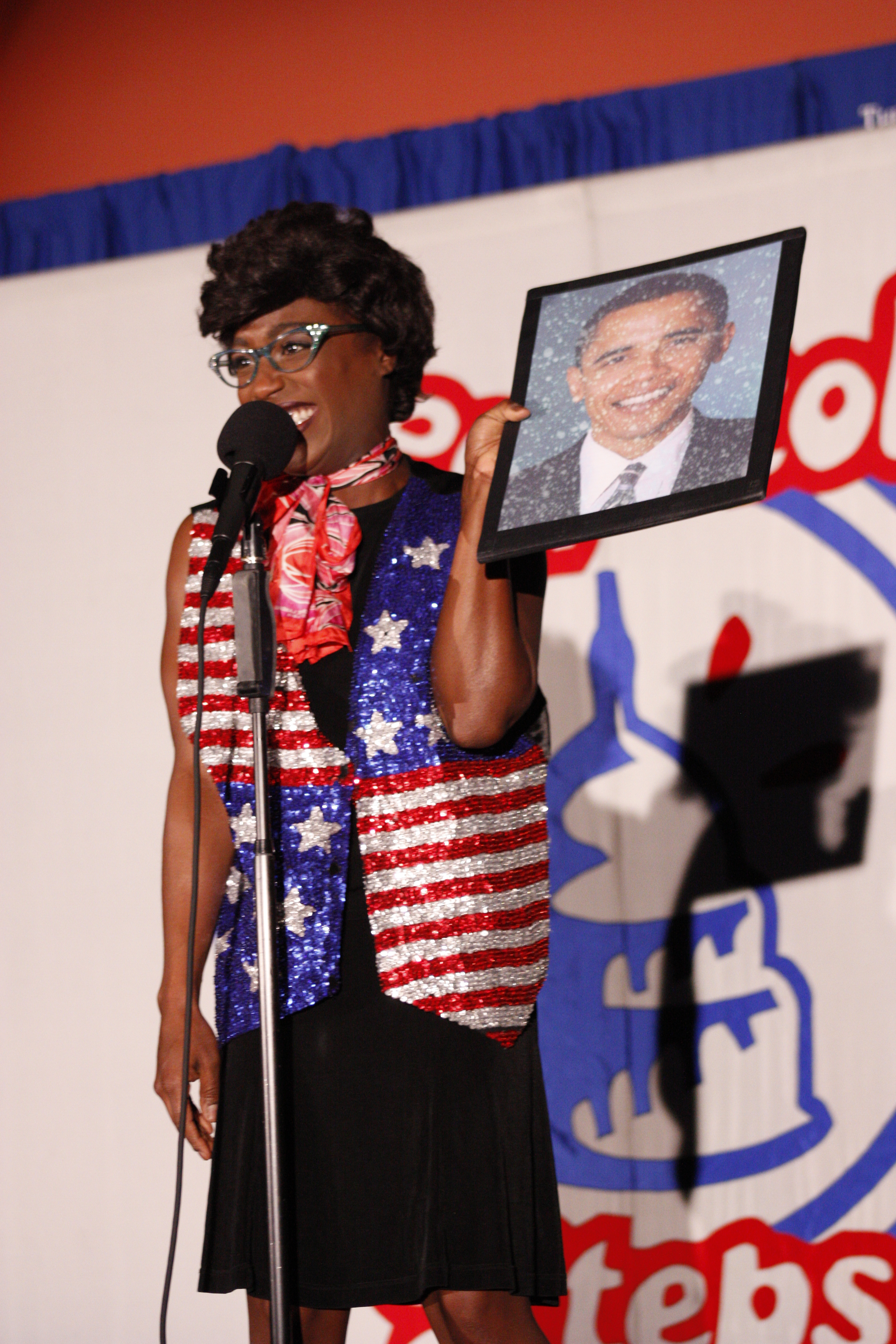
Obama campaign skit with cast member Felicia Curry

They released several albums during the Obama administration, including Mock the Vote, How to Succeed in Congress without Really Lying, Fiscal Shades of Gray, Take the Money and Run for President, Desperate Housemembers, Liberal Shop of Horrors, and Obama Mia.

== Trump years ==
They released Orange Is the New Barack in 2017.

== Biden years ==
On January 25, 2021, an update on the Capitol Steps website indicated that "the Capitol Steps are planning to turn off the stage lights".

In 2022, several former Capitol Steps began performing under the name DC’s Reflecting Fools. The new group blended new songs written by Mark Eaton with some classic Capitol Steps material. In September 2026, DC’s Reflecting Fools was using the name The Capitol Fools.

== Live shows ==
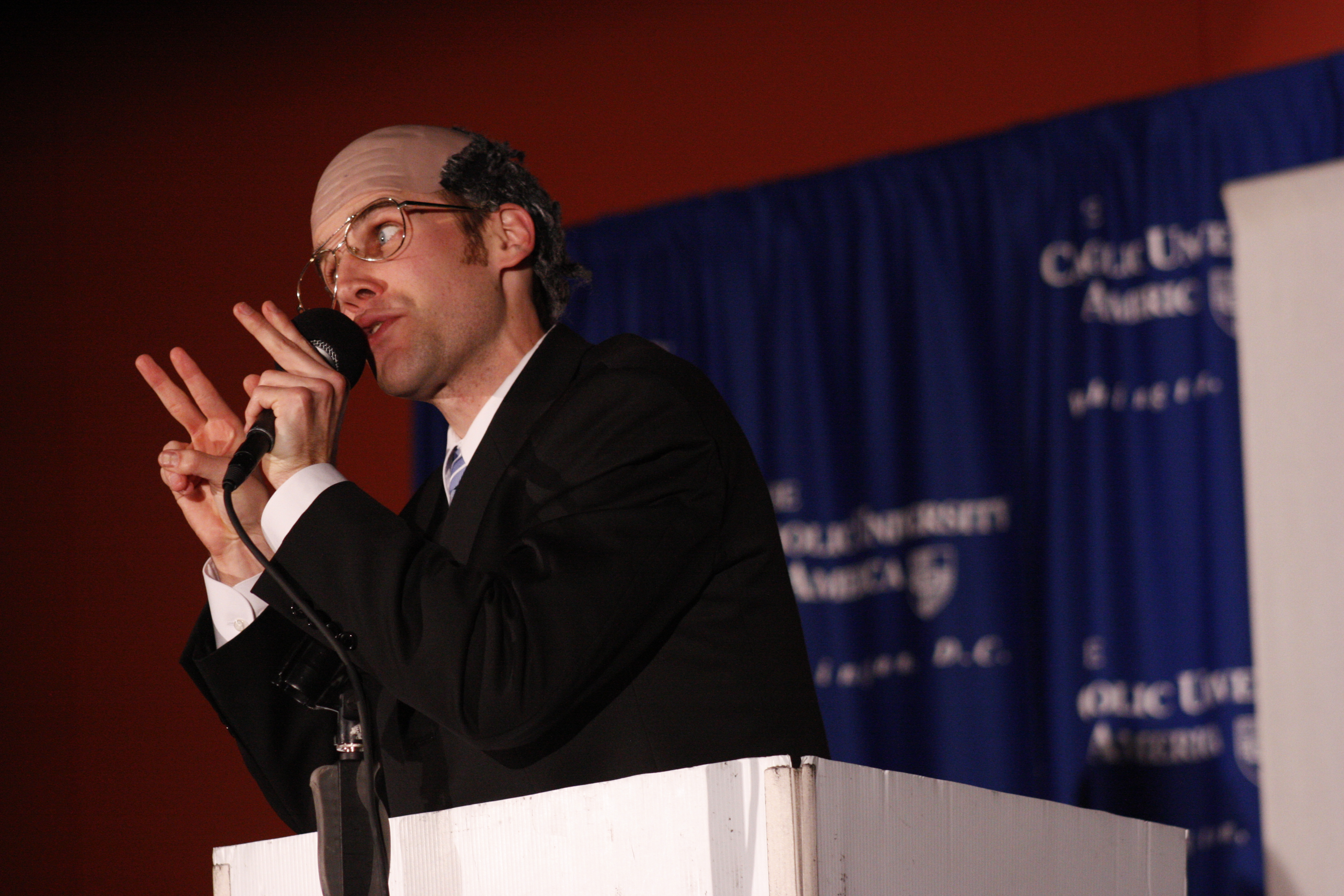
At the Catholic University of America in 2008

The Capitol Steps regularly performed as many as 700 shows per year. As of 2017, the Capitol Steps had multiple casts, with 24 cast members:

- Brian Ash
- Jon Bell
- Bari Biern
- Mike Carruthers
- Evan Casey
- Jenny Corbett
- Kevin Corbett
- Janet Davidson Gordon
- Nancy Dolliver
- Morgan Duncan
- Mark Eaton
- Corey Harris
- Prince Havely
- Emily Levey
- Elaina Newport
- Richard Paul
- Jack Rowles
- Ann Schmitt
- Tracey Stephens
- Mike Thornton
- Brad Van Grack
- Delores Williams
- Anne Willis Hill
- Jamie Zemarel

As of 2017, the group also had five pianists:

- Emily Bell Spitz
- Howard Breitbart
- Marc Irwin
- David Kane
- Lenny Williams

The group performed public and private shows throughout the country, and appeared at the Ronald Reagan Building and International Trade Center in Washington, D.C. every Friday and Saturday at 7:30 p.m. year-round.

== Recordings ==
Since their first album in 1984, the Capitol Steps have released a new recording of their songs, parodies, and sketches at least once a year (usually in the late spring). The group has also released holiday recordings in 1989, 1993 and 2006. A 2001 "special high school release", revised and re-released in 2005, is made up of songs written for participants of the National Young Leaders Conference in Washington, at which the group has performed. Their 20th-anniversary book included a CD retrospective of their work.

== Discography ==
=== Albums ===
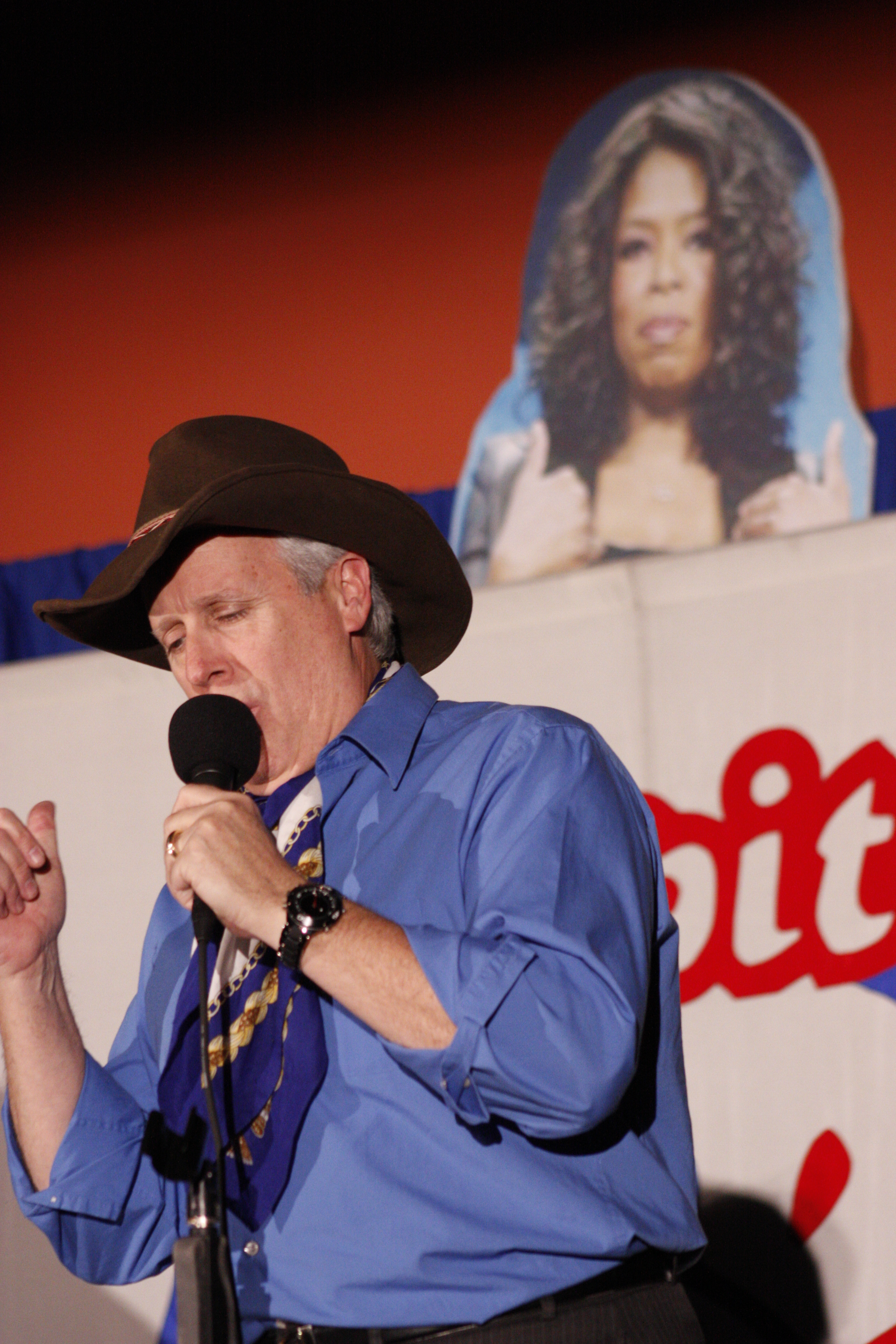
Cast member Jamie Zemeral lampoons Oprah Winfrey in 2008

1. Capitol Steps Live! at the Shoreham (1984)
2. We Arm the World (1985)
3. Thank God I'm a Contra Boy (1986)
4. Workin' 9 to 10 (1987)
5. Shamlet (1988)
6. Stand By Your Dan (1989)
7. Danny's First Noel (1989 holiday release)
8. Georgie on My Mind (1989–1990)
9. Sheik, Rattle and Roll (1990)
10. 76 Bad Loans (1991)
11. Fools on the Hill (1992)
12. The Joy of Sax (1993)
13. All I Want for Christmas Is a Tax Increase (1993 holiday release)
14. Lord of the Fries (1994)
15. A Whole Newt World (1995)
16. Return to Center (1996)
17. Sixteen Scandals (1997)
18. Unzippin' My Doo-dah (1998)
19. First Lady and the Tramp (1999)
20. It's Not Over 'Til the First Lady Sings (2000)
21. I Want It Dad's Way (2001 high-school release, revised and re-released in 2005)
22. One Bush, Two Bush, Old Bush, New Bush (2001)
23. When Bush Comes to Shove (2002)
24. Between Iraq and a Hard Place (2003)
25. Papa's Got a Brand New Baghdad (2004)
26. Four More Years in the Bush Leagues (2005)
27. I'm So Indicted (2006)
28. O Christmas Bush (2006 holiday release)
29. Springtime for Liberals (2007)
30. Campaign and Suffering (2008)
31. Obama Mia! (2009)
32. Barackin' Around the Christmas Tree (2009 holiday release)
33. Liberal Shop of Horrors (2010)
34. Desperate House Members (2011)
35. Weiner Wonderland (2011 holiday release)
36. Take the Money and Run for President (2012)
37. Fiscal Shades of Grey (2013)
38. How to Succeed in Congress Without Really Lying (2014)
39. Mock the Vote (2015)
40. What to Expect When You're Electing (2016)
41. Orange Is the New Barack (2017)
42. Make America Grin Again (2018)
43. The Lyin' Kings (2019)

=== Singles ===
The group released "Ronald the Red-Faced Reagan" for the 1987 holidays, "Like a Suburban Drone" in 1990 and "From Yankee Doodle to Pander Bear", a history of American political satire, early in Bill Clinton's first term.

== See also ==
- Theatre in Washington, D.C.
