= Democrats for Life of America =

American political nonprofit organization

- Type: 501(c)(4) non-profit organization
- Tax ID no.: 75-2824023
- Purpose: Consistent Life Ethic political advocacy within the Democratic Party
- Coordinates: 38.893909°N 77.020669°W
- Region served: United States
- President: Monica Sparks
- Executive Director: Kristen Day
- Revenue: $86,557 (2018)
- Expenses: $88,468 (2018)
- Employees: 7 (2018)
- Website: www.democratsforlife.org

Democrats for Life of America (DFLA) is a 501(c)(4) American political advocacy nonprofit organization that seeks to elect anti-abortion Democrats and to encourage the Democratic Party to oppose euthanasia, capital punishment, and abortion in line with consistent life ethic. DFLA's position on abortion is in opposition to the current platform of the Democratic Party, which unequivocally supports abortion rights with minimal restrictions.

Democrats for Life calls for the return of the 2000 Democratic Party Platform's position on abortion, which acknowledged the diversity of opinion on the topic.

The group generally refrains from taking positions on socioeconomic issues or foreign policy. They have drafted the Pregnant Women Support Act, a comprehensive package of federal legislation and policy proposals that supporters hope will increase access to maternal healthcare and reduce the demand and number of abortions. They have an affiliated political action committee, DFLA PAC.

They have proposed linking a ban on abortions after 20 weeks of gestation to increased support for pregnant women and mothers, such as paid medical leave and/or more support for affordable day care.

== History ==
In 1999, Democrats for Life of America was founded to coordinate, at a national level, the efforts of anti-abortion Democrats.

In the 1960s and 1970s, anti-abortion Democrats comprised a substantial portion of the party's membership in both the United States House of Representatives and the United States Senate. Some Democratic presidential and vice-presidential candidates ran for those offices as anti-abortion, including Hubert Humphrey and Sargent Shriver. Others were once anti-abortion before running, such as Ted Kennedy, Jesse Jackson, Bill Clinton, and Al Gore. In the 1980s, the influence of anti-abortion advocates in the Democratic Party declined slowly but considerably.

At the 1992 Democratic National Convention, anti-abortion Governor Robert Casey of Pennsylvania was reportedly "barred from addressing the Convention because of his anti-abortion views". The official reason given by the Convention organizers was that Casey was not allowed to speak because he did not support the Democratic ticket. Kathy Taylor, a pro-abortion rights activist from Pennsylvania, instead addressed the convention. Taylor was a Republican who had worked for Casey's opponent in the previous gubernatorial election. Several anti-abortion Democrats did address the delegates in 1992, though they did not address the anti-abortion stance, and were not given prominent prime time slots. Governor Casey's son Bob Casey Jr., also an anti-abortion Democrat, spoke during the 2008 Democratic National Convention.

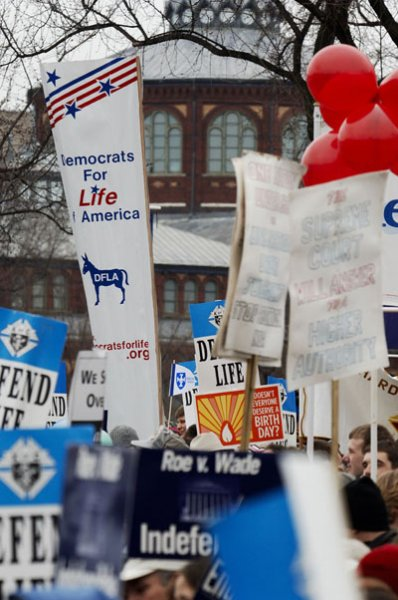
A DFLA banner at the 2006 March for Life.

== Anti-abortion Democrats in recent elections ==
=== 2004 ===
In their 2005 book, Take It Back: Our Party, Our Country, Our Future, Paul Begala and James Carville praised Democrats for Life for their work that led to the Pregnant Women Support Act. In the book they say the legislation "is built around 17 concrete policy proposals that would reduce the number of abortions.... We believe these proposals would do more to prevent abortions than all the speeches, all the marches and all the campaign ads the pro-lifers have used over the past thirty years." They go on to call it "both good politics and, we think, good policy". The initiative has become legislation known as the Pregnant Women Support Act, which "has gained broad support and even has attracted some Republican backers". The Commonwealth of Virginia is the first state to pass a version of the PWSA.

Organizations and individuals who support the bill include the National Association of Evangelicals, Sojourners/Call to Renewal, U.S. Conference of Catholic Bishops, Americans United for Life, National Council on Adoption, Life Education and Resource Network, Redeem the Vote, Care Net, Tony Campolo (founder of the Evangelical Association for the Promotion of Education), Joe Turnham (Chairman, Alabama Democratic Party), U.S. Senator Bob Casey Jr., and actor Martin Sheen.

=== 2010 ===
The organization has endorsed Congresswoman Kathy Dahlkemper and Congressmen Jim Oberstar, Joe Donnelly, Steve Driehaus, and many other anti-abortion Democrats for the 2010 midterm elections, and its PAC raised over $42,000 in 2010. Of the four mentioned above, only Donnelly was reelected. Oberstar was defeated after 18 terms. Additionally, all four of the freshmen endorsed by DFLA in 2008 were defeated for re-election in 2010 (see above).

=== 2018 ===
Representative Dan Lipinski, a long-time anti-abortion Democrat, from one of Illinois' Chicago-area House districts won his primary. Three Democratic Senators, who self-identify as anti-abortion, had voted to ban abortion after 20 weeks and ran for reelection to the US Senate; Bob Casey of Pennsylvania, Joe Donnelly of Indiana, and Joe Manchin of West Virginia had all voted with most Republicans on the issue. Donnelly and Manchin had been endorsed by Democrats for Life in their reelection bids.

On the afternoon of July 20, 2018, DLFA Executive Director Kristen Day hosted an event where anti-abortion Democrats from around the nation gathered for their first annual conference at a Radisson Hotel in Aurora, Colorado. Over 18 individual speaking sessions were arranged over the course of three days. The keynote speaker on Friday evening was former U.S. Representative Bart Stupak (D-MI) who was instrumental in keeping abortion funding out of the Affordable Care Act in 2010. Stupak discussed the challenges of being an anti-abortion Democrat while promoting his new book For All Americans.

=== 2020 ===
Representative Dan Lipinski was defeated in a primary election against Marie Newman. Representatives Collin Peterson and Ben McAdams were both defeated in their general election races. This left Henry Cuellar as the only anti-abortion Democrat in the House of Representatives. In the aftermath of the 2020 election, DFLA protested efforts for repeal the Hyde Amendment, staging a "Day of Action" after the House passed a COVID relief bill that did not include the measure.

=== 2021 ===
Treneé McGee, an anti-abortion Democrat who was endorsed by Democrats for Life, won a seat in the Connecticut House of Representatives on December 22, 2021. She won this seat in a special election following the arrest and subsequent resignation of Michael DiMassa. McGee is currently the youngest black woman ever elected to the Connecticut General Assembly.

=== 2024 ===
Terrisa Bukovinac, former president of DFLA, challenged Joe Biden in the Democratic presidential primary to call attention to the issue.

At the 2024 Democratic National Convention, in response to Planned Parenthood's announcement that they would offer free abortions in a "mobile health clinic" parked outside of the convention, DFLA announced a diaper drive which ended up delivering over 44,000 free diapers and wipes to pregnancy centers in Chicago. The group also hosted an event outside the convention to advocate for an expanded child tax credit and a proposal to eliminate out-of-pocket medical expenses surrounding childbirth, among other things.

== See also ==
- Abortion debate
- American Solidarity Party
- Anti-abortion feminism
- Centre-left politics
- Centrism
- Conservative Democrat
- Communitarianism
- Consistent ethic of life
- Culture of life
- Factions in the Democratic Party
- Fetal and children's rights
- Libertarians for Life
- Philosophical aspects
- Reagan Democrat
- Republican Majority for Choice
- Sanctity of life
- United States anti-abortion movement
