= Pregnant Women Support Act =

The Pregnant Women Support Act was created by the Democrats for Life of America and introduced into Congress by then Representative Lincoln Davis of Tennessee. The Senate companion bill was introduced by Senator Bob Casey Jr. of Pennsylvania. The package was included as part of the Affordable Care Act (ACA) as a grant program to states to support pregnant women and provide a choice to parent rather than abort their child.

It is, according to Democrats for Life, "a comprehensive package of federal legislation and policy proposals that will reduce the number of abortions... While both Democrats and Republicans talk about reducing the number of abortions, Democrats for Life of America offers real solutions to make this goal a reality. With bold new ideas, sound research and policy arguments, the Pregnant Women Support Act contains proven policy suggestions to dramatically reduce the number of abortions in America."

In their 2005 book, Take It Back: Our Party, Our Country, Our Future, Paul Begala and James Carville praise Democrats for Life their work. In the book they say the Act "is built around seventeen concrete policy proposals that would reduce the number of abortions.... We believe these proposals would do more to prevent abortions than all the speeches, all the marches and all the campaign ads the pro-lifers have used over the past 30 years." They go on to call it "both good politics and, we think, good policy."
