= Between Iraq and a Hard Place =

Live album by Capitol Steps
- Released: June 3, 2003
- Recorded: 2002
- Genre: Comedy
- Length: 62:15
- Label: Self-published
- Producer: Elaina Newport

Capitol Steps chronology
When Bush Comes to Shove (2002)	Between Iraq and a Hard Place (2003)	Papa's Got a Brand New Baghdad (2004)

Professional ratings
Review scores
Source	Rating
AllMusic	(4.5/5)

Between Iraq and a Hard Place is a 2003 album by the Capitol Steps.

== Track listing ==
1. "God Bless My SUV"
2. "Hans Blix and the Inspectors"
3. "401K"
4. "Korea"
5. "Clinton Thinks the French Have a Lot of Gaul"
6. "Talk 'bout Saddam"
7. "I've Grown a Culture in This Place"
8. "Hang Down Your Head, Tom Daschle"
9. "You Don't Bring Me Flowers"
10. "You Can't Fly with Giant Thighs"
11. "Sound of Moose-Sick"
12. "Toricelli"
13. "Agent 2004"
14. "It's Not Easy Bein' White"
15. "Bibbidy Bobbidy Spew"
16. "Condoleezza"
17. "Kleptomaniac"
18. "Danger's in the Bite"
19. "This Fish is Made for Walkin'"
20. "Heard It on the Nightline"
21. "The Law Firm of Zacarias Moussaoui"
22. "Speaker of the House"
23. "Lirty Dies: Sadman Maddam & Yubble-Doo, Prad Beasts, and Lenator Sott"
