= Chamaco Rivera =

Puerto Rican singer and songwriter

- Born: Cristóbal Senquis Rivera; November 16, 1946 (age 79); Guayama, Puerto Rico
- Genres: Salsa, Merengue, Bolero
- Years active: 1963–present

Cristóbal Senquis Rivera (born November 16, 1946), known professionally as Chamaco Rivera, is a Puerto Rican singer and songwriter.

== Early life ==
Rivera was born in Guayama, Puerto Rico to parents Vicenta Senquis and Carmelo Rivera. At age 14, Rivera discovered his passion for singing when composer Alfonso Pillot gave him the opportunity to sing in his band.

== Career ==
In 1962, Rivera moved to New York City. The following year, he joined the band New Jersey Swing Combo. He also sang in Mike Hernández's band, where he was given the nickname "Chamaco" as Rivera was the youngest member of the group.

In 1970, Rivera began performing with Willie Rosario's band and was featured in his album De Donde Nace el Ritmo, in which he recorded his well-known hit "La Vida". He also recorded a second album, Mas Ritmo, with Rosario in 1972. Rivera was also one of the featured artists in Rafael Cortijo's 1974 album, Con las Siete Potencias.

In 1974, Rivera formed his own band and recorded his first solo album, Chamaco. Many solo recordings followed, including Mi Chamaco (1976), El Juicio (1978), Canción, Hombre y Pueblo (1980), and Chamaco Para Buen Rato (1981). Rivera's 1984 album Por Fin features the song "Consuelo", a duet recorded alongside José Feliciano. In 1987, Rivera returned to collaborate with Willie Rosario for a live concert in Cali, Colombia. Rivera continued to record songs and produce new albums well into the 1990s. In 1994, he wrote and recorded the song "Contestame Dios Mio" (a tribute song to fellow singer Hector Lavoe, who died the previous year) for his album Aqui Estoy.

In 2011, Rivera recorded two new songs, "Matalas" and "Milagro 33", the latter being a tribute to the 33 miners involved in the 2010 Copiapó mining accident. Rivera teamed up with fellow singer Meñique as well as bandleader Ivan Marrero for the album El Gran Meñique y Chamaco Rivera Presentan Iván Marrero y su Charanga, which was released in 2013.

In 2017, Rivera reunited with Willie Rosario for the first time in 45 years and recorded their latest collaboration single, "Se Volvieron a Juntar".

== Personal life ==
Rivera has been married to Elizabeth Senquis since 1972, and both currently reside in St.Cloud, Florida. They have 3 kids together. Before this marriage he fathered 2; who are the oldest. During his marriage he has had extramarital affairs leading to other children being born; Jocelyn Senquis and Chadel Senquis, this last one being the youngest of his children.

He currently performs in small local and international venues.

== Discography ==
- 1974: Chamaco
- 1976: Mi Chamaco
- 1978: El Juicio
- 1980: Canción, Hombre y Pueblo
- 1981: Chamaco Para Buen Rato
- 1984: Por Fin
- 1985: Chamaco
- 1986: Chamaco Rivera
- 1992: Merengue Music Machine
- 1993: En La Batalla
- 1994: Aquí Estoy
- 2011: Chamaco
- 2011: Toda Una Historia
- 2013: El Gran Meñique y Chamaco Rivera Presentan Iván Marrero y su Charanga
