= Chamaco Ramírez =

Puerto Rican musician

Chamaco Ramirez
- Also known as: Chamaco, Chamo
- Born: Ramon Luis Ramirez Toro; September 10, 1941; Santurce, Puerto Rico
- Died: March 27, 1983 (aged 41) Bronx, New York
- Genre: Salsa
- Years active: 1957—1983

Chamaco Ramirez (September 10, 1941 - March 27, 1983) was a Puerto Rican salsa singer and composer. He came to prominence and is still mostly remembered for his work as singer of the Tommy Olivencia Orchestra.

== Early years ==
Ramirez, was born Ramon Luis Ramirez Toro in the Parada 26 section of Santurce, Puerto Rico. A naturally gifted musician since his early youth, at the age of 16 and while still a High School student, he joined Tommy Olivencia to start the orchestra which would bear Olivencia's name and which would later go by the moniker of La Primerisima Orquesta de Puerto Rico.

== Tommy Olivencia y Su Orquesta ==
With Tommy Olivencia y Su Orquesta, in which Ramirez shared vocals with Paquito Guzmán, he would work from 1960 to 1971 and again from 1974 to 1976. He recorded eight albums with this orchestra which are now considered classics of the salsa genre. In the 1960s, while still a member of Tommy Olivencia y Su Orquesta, he also contributed vocals to albums by the Alegre All Stars and Kako and his Orchestra.

Besides his vocal work which was marked by his ability to improvise, he was also a gifted composer who wrote the Salsa classic, Trucutu, later covered by Marc Anthony.

Although having a brief career, Chamaco's songs with Tommy Olivencia's orchestra left a lasting legacy among musicians and performers of younger generations. Songs such as "Plante Bandera" and "Evelio Y La Rumba" (both composed by Tite Curet Alonso) were later covered by artists as diverse as Tego Calderon, Tempo Alomar, and Los Soneros Del Barrio.

== Later work ==
After leaving Tommy Olivencia's orchestra, Ramirez moved to New York City where he worked with the orchestra of Kako Bastar. Later he would move to Los Angeles where he worked with two minor local orchestras. In 1979, he released his first and only solo album, titled Alive and Kicking.

== Later years and death ==
During his later years, Ramirez had frequent problems with the law related to his use of illegal drugs. On the morning of March 27, 1983, he was the victim of a shooting in the Bronx, New York City, and died in an ambulance as he was being taken to the hospital.

== Documentary ==
In April 2013, the documentary Alive and Kicking: La historia de Chamaco Ramírez was reported to be in production, with filming scheduled in Puerto Rico through April 30. The film was being produced by Agúzate Productions and Deboka Films and directed by Puerto Rican filmmakers Eduardo Cintrón and Omar Torres Kortright, both based in Chicago. Reported participants included salsa musicians Gilberto Santa Rosa, Luis "Perico" Ortiz, Pupy Cantor and Cheo Feliciano, as well as rappers Tego Calderón and Vico C. Ramírez's family supported the project, and his son, Chamaco Ramírez Jr., contributed to research and production. According to the report, archival research had uncovered previously unseen footage and unreleased songs by Ramírez.

In February 2017, Salserísimo Perú reported that the filmmakers were still seeking to bring the documentary to the big screen. According to the report, music licensing costs remained beyond their available resources despite what they described as positive signs in negotiations with Código/Fania Records. The filmmakers had also sought funding from public and private institutions to help move the project forward.

== Discography ==
=== Tommy Olivencia y Su Orquesta ===
- Trucutu (1965)
- Jala-Jala Y Guaguancó (1966)
- La Nueva Sensación Musical De Puerto Rico (1967)
- Fire Fire -(Fuego)(Fuego) (1967)
- Quito Vélez, Los Montemar, Lo Mejor 1960s (1971)
- Juntos de Nuevo (1974)
- Planté Bandera - A Mi Pai Chango (1975)

=== The Alegre All Stars ===
- Way Out - The Alegre All Stars Vol. 4. (1966)
- The Salsa All Stars (1972)
- They Just Don't Makim Like Us Any More (1972)

=== Kako and His Orchestra ===
- Sock It to Me Latino (1968)

=== Solo albums ===
- Alive and Kicking (1979)

== See also ==
- List of Puerto Ricans
