= The Subject Was Roses (film) =

1968 American film by Ulu Grosbard

- Original poster
- Directed by: Ulu Grosbard
- Written by: Frank D. Gilroy
- Based on: The Subject Was Roses; 1964 play by Frank D. Gilroy
- Produced by: Edgar Lansbury
- Starring: Patricia Neal; Jack Albertson; Martin Sheen
- Cinematography: Jack Priestley
- Edited by: Gerald B. Greenberg
- Music by: Lee Pockriss
- Distributed by: Metro-Goldwyn-Mayer
- Release date: October 13, 1968
- Running time: 107 minutes
- Country: United States
- Language: English
- Box office: $1,375,000 (US/ Canada rentals)

The Subject Was Roses is a 1968 American Metrocolor drama film directed by Ulu Grosbard. The screenplay by Frank D. Gilroy is based on his 1964 Pulitzer Prize-winning play of the same title. The film stars Patricia Neal, Martin Sheen and Jack Albertson, the latter two reprising their roles from the original play. The film follows a World War II veteran (Sheen) who returns home to the Bronx and soon becomes disillusioned to find his parents' (Neal and Albertson) marriage filled with discord, quarreling, and recriminations.

The film was released to unanimous praise, remaining one of few films with a 100% rating on Rotten Tomatoes, and various accolades. Neal and Albertson received nominations for Best Actress and Best Supporting Actor at the 41st Academy Awards, with Albertson winning his nomination; Sheen was nominated for Best Supporting Actor at the 26th Golden Globe Awards. It was also selected as one of the National Board of Review's top 10 films of the year.

== Plot ==
Returning to his Bronx home following World War II, Timmy Cleary (Martin Sheen) discovers his middle class parents have drifted apart and quarrel at every slightest provocation. Once closer to his mother Nettie (Patricia Neal), Timmy finds himself bonding with his salesman father, John (Jack Albertson), but tries to remain neutral when intervening in their disputes.

En route home after a day trip to the family's summer cottage with his father, Timmy purchases a bouquet of roses and suggests John present them to his wife. Nettie is thrilled by his apparent thoughtfulness, and the three spend the evening nightclubbing in Manhattan. When an inebriated John, whose infidelities have already been revealed, attempts to make love to his wife later that night, Nettie rejects his advances, suggesting he go to "one of his whores", and breaks the vase of flowers, provoking John to reveal it was Timmy who bought them.

The following morning, Timmy refuses to go to Mass with John, as his time in the service has made him question his faith, leading to a heated argument between them. After John leaves, Timmy gets into an argument with his mother, in which he accuses her of trying to make him choose between his parents and vents about other past grievances. Afterwards, Nettie goes out and has what she considers to be the most peaceful twelve hours of her life. Meanwhile, John gets into another heated argument with a half-drunk Timmy about other past grievances on both sides, which ends with John slapping Timmy across the face, just before Nettie returns. Timmy realizes the domestic situation is not likely to improve, and that he's unwittingly made things worse, and he announces he is leaving home, a decision his parents grudgingly accept. When he changes his mind, his father insists he stick to his plan and the three eat one final breakfast together before he departs. As John starts to complain about the coffee, the screen abruptly freezes and fades to black.

== Cast ==
- Patricia Neal as Nettie Cleary
- Jack Albertson as John Cleary
- Martin Sheen as Timmy Cleary
- Don Saxon as Nightclub M.C.
- Elaine Williams as Woman in Club
- Grant Gordon as Man in Restaurant

== Production ==
This was the first film directed by Ulu Grosbard, who had been nominated for the Tony Award for his direction of the 1964 Broadway production of Frank D. Gilroy's play. Joining him were original cast members Jack Albertson and Martin Sheen as John and Timmy Cleary; Patricia Neal replaced Irene Dailey in the role of Nettie.

The film was a significant comeback for Neal, who was recovering from a debilitating stroke she had suffered three years earlier and hadn't appeared on screen since In Harm's Way in 1965. During filming, the actress was beset with memory problems and physical limitations she struggled to overcome, and in her autobiography As I Am, she described the experience as a career milestone that convinced her she still was a good actress. She also discussed her effort to memorize a five-page monologue she was required to do in one take and her pride at doing so successfully.

The film was shot on location in New York City, Spring Lake, New Jersey, and Belmar, New Jersey (the Belmar Fishing Club).

The soundtrack includes "Who Knows Where the Time Goes?" (written by Sandy Denny) and "Albatross," both performed by Judy Collins (who wrote the latter song).

== Critical reception ==
Vincent Canby of The New York Times called the film "one of those ... middle-class domestic dramas that — for various reasons — time has passed by, as it has the Philco Playhouse ... The play has been brought to the screen with flat, fatal fidelity by Mr. Gilroy ... Quite awkwardly (since it makes you aware of everything else you are not seeing), the one-set play has been opened up with several excursions outside the Bronx apartment. What's worse, Mr. Grosbard has retained the Broadway pace, which is particularly evident in the performances of Mr. Albertson and Mr. Sheen ... The tempo of the acting often seems to be outrunning the movie itself ... Miss Neal's presence ... gives the movie an emotional impact it wouldn't otherwise have ... She has, in fact, simply too much style and wit for this kind of monosyllabic nonsense."

Roger Ebert of the Chicago Sun-Times thought Gilroy's "extraordinary play ... has been filmed with the greatest care, but it fails as a movie. It is hard to say exactly why. There's nothing obviously wrong, but when you walk out you don't feel as if you've been there. Something was missing." He added, "Part of the problem is with the actors, I think ... Albertson and Sheen ... talk loudly, their movements are too obvious, they are trying to project ... Miss Neal, who knows the movies, is better suited to the medium. She holds back, she suggests more than she reveals, and when all three actors are on camera her performance makes the other two look embarrassingly theatrical. And there is where the movie fails."

Variety said, "The terrific writing, which top-notch performances make more magnificent, displays a wide range of human emotions, without recourse to cheap sensationalism or dialog. Grosbard's perceptive direction keeps the bickering and banter from becoming shrill histrionics."

TV Guide rated the film four stars, citing "the terrific acting, sharp writing, and outstanding direction from Grosbard" and adding, "Never does the emotion explode into oratory, so almost every scene has an underlying tension that continues to bubble."

The film has a 100% on Rotten Tomatoes.

== Awards and nominations ==
Award	Category	Nominee(s)	Result	Ref.
Academy Awards	Best Actress	Patricia Neal	Nominated	
Academy Awards	Best Supporting Actor	Jack Albertson	Won	
Golden Globe Awards	Best Supporting Actor – Motion Picture	Martin Sheen	Nominated	
Laurel Awards	Top Female Dramatic Performance	Patricia Neal	Nominated	
National Board of Review Awards	Top Ten Films		6th Place	

== See also ==
- List of American films of 1968
