= Kennedy (1983 miniseries) =

- Written by: Reg Gadney
- Directed by: Jim Goddard
- Starring: Martin Sheen; Blair Brown; John Shea; E. G. Marshall; Geraldine Fitzgerald; Vincent Gardenia; Kelsey Grammer
- Music by: Richard Hartley
- Countries of origin: United States; United Kingdom
- Original language: English
- No. of episodes: 3

Production
- Executive producers: Alan Landsburg; Margaret Matheson
- Producer: Andrew Brown
- Cinematography: Ernest Vincze
- Editors: Andrew Nelson; Ralph Sheldon
- Running time: 242 minutes
- Production companies: Alan Landsburg Productions; Central Independent Television

Original release
- Network: NBC
- Release: November 20 – November 22, 1983

Kennedy is a 1983 five-hour television miniseries written by Reg Gadney and directed by Jim Goddard. The miniseries is a biography of the 1961–1963 presidency of John F. Kennedy. It was co-produced by Alan Landsburg Productions and Central Independent Television and originally aired in the United States starting on November 20, 1983, and concluding on November 22, the twentieth anniversary of Kennedy's assassination.

The miniseries stars Martin Sheen as President John F. Kennedy, Blair Brown as Jacqueline Kennedy, John Shea as Robert F. Kennedy, E. G. Marshall as Joseph P. Kennedy Sr., Geraldine Fitzgerald as Rose Kennedy, Vincent Gardenia as J. Edgar Hoover, and Kelsey Grammer as Stephen Smith amongst many others.

The series was originally broadcast on NBC, and was also sold to 50 countries, with 27 of them broadcasting the series simultaneously.

== Cast ==
- Martin Sheen as John F. Kennedy
- Blair Brown as Jacqueline Kennedy
- John Shea as Robert F. Kennedy
- E. G. Marshall as Joseph P. Kennedy Sr.
- Geraldine Fitzgerald as Rose Kennedy
- Vincent Gardenia as J. Edgar Hoover
- Kelsey Grammer as Stephen Smith
- Charles Brown as Martin Luther King Jr.
- Kevin Conroy as Edward M. Kennedy
- Nesbitt Blaisdell as Lyndon B. Johnson
- Tom Brennan as Adlai Stevenson
- Ellen Parker as Ethel Kennedy
- Donald Neal as Ralph Yarborough
- John Glover as Bill
- Jessica Ann Durr as Caroline Kennedy (ages 5–6)
- Hannah Fallon as Caroline Kennedy (ages 3–4)
- James Burge as Peter Lawford
- Peter Boyden as Pierre Salinger
- Laurie Kennedy as Patricia Kennedy Lawford
- Joe Lowry as Dave Powers
- Joanna Camp as Eunice Kennedy Shriver
- Al Conti as Sargent Shriver
- Frances Conroy as Jean Kennedy Smith
- Kent Broadhurst as Richard Paul Pavlick
- Peggy Hewitt as Letitia Baldrige
- David Leary as Arthur Schlesinger Jr.
- Don MacLaughlin as Chief Justice Earl Warren
- Larry Keith as Stanley Levison
- Harry Madsen as Clint Hill
- Tanny McDonald as Lady Bird Johnson
- Carmen Mathews as Mamie Eisenhower
- David Schramm as Robert McNamara
- Janet Sheen as Elaine de Kooning
- Trey Wilson as Kenneth O'Donnell
- George Guidall as Nicholas Katzenbach
- Barton Heyman as Curtis LeMay
- J. R. Dusenberry as John Connally
- Margo Tully as Nellie Connally
- Satch Franklin as extra at armoury

== Reception ==
The series was nominated for three Golden Globes and four BAFTA Awards, and won the latter for Best Drama Series or Serial and Best Make Up.

=== Nielsen Ratings ===
Part 1 averaged a 12.0/17, against The Day After, and ranked 54th out of 64 programs the week of November 14–20, 1983. However, Parts 2 and 3 both ranked in the Top 10 for the week, with Part 2 averaging a 22.3/34 and Part 3 averaging a 24.3/37. Out of 64 programs airing the week of November 21–27, 1983, Part 2 ranked 6th for the week, and Part 3 ranked 4th for the week.

== See also ==
- Cultural depictions of John F. Kennedy
- Robert F. Kennedy in media
- Assassination of John F. Kennedy in popular culture
