= Star of Artaban =

Sapphire

The 287–carat Star of Artaban, housed in the National Museum of Natural History, Washington D.C., is an unusually large blue star sapphire.

The Star of Artaban is a 287–carat cabochon-cut star sapphire currently located at the Smithsonian National Museum of Natural History. Its origin is somewhat obscure but it is believed to come from Sri Lanka. Unlike some other sapphires, it is not transparent and is of a milky blue colour. It was donated by an anonymous member of the Georgia Mineral Society in the 1941–1943 time period.

The name of the gem is based on the 1895 tale of The Other Wise Man by Henry van Dyke. The story's hero, Artaban, was a wise man from Persia who set out to join the Biblical Magi in their journey to see the newborn Jesus. He purchased three great gems, one of which was a sapphire, to present as a gift to the newborn king. He never achieved his goal, and gave his gems to the needy instead.

== See also ==
- Star of Asia
- Star of Bombay
- Star of India (gem)
- Star of Adam
- List of individual gemstones
- List of sapphires by size
