= National Razor =

National Razor may refer to:

- The Guillotine, an execution device named after Joseph-Ignace Guillotin
- National Razor (band), an American punk rock band that formed in 1998 in Baltimore, Maryland.
