= Goodbye, Dr. Fate =

Studio album by Trusty
- Released: May 1995
- Recorded: November 1993 – October 1994
- Genre: Indie rock
- Length: 41:16
- Language: English
- Label: Dischord
- Producer: Trusty

Trusty chronology
Kathy's Keen (1993)	Goodbye, Dr. Fate (1995)	The Fourth Wise Man (1996)

Goodbye, Dr. Fate is the second full-length record by the punk rock band Trusty, released on Dischord Records in 1995.

Less cryptic than The Fourth Wise Man, which the group recorded two years later, Goodbye is lighter, with a more conventional pop sound. The title is presumably a reference to the comic book character Doctor Fate.

Goodbye, Dr. Fate

1. There Goes Sally
2. "Goodbye, Dr. Fate"
3. Joseph and Jennifer
4. Boy and His Dog
5. King Snake
6. Wicked
7. Honey Mustard
8. 4:30
9. Shopping List
10. Serendipity
11. Kal-el
12. A Modest Proposal
13. Wife
14. The Tale of the Swazi Pascha and the Tiger
