= The Other Wise Man =

- Short story by Henry van Dyke Jr.
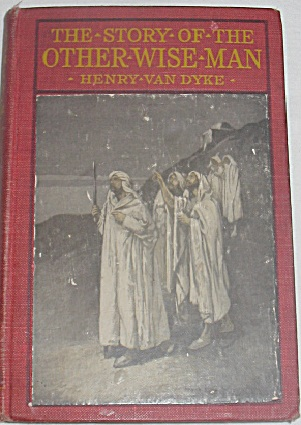
- Book edition published by Harper & Brothers

Text available at Wikisource
- Country: United States
- Language: English
- Genre: Inspirational fiction

Publication

The Story of the Other Wise Man is a short novel or long short story by Henry van Dyke. It was first published in Harper's Magazine in January 1893 and has been reprinted many times since then.

== Story ==
The story is an addition to and expansion of the account of the Biblical Magi, recounted in the Gospel of Matthew in the New Testament. It tells about a "fourth" wise man (accepting the tradition that the Magi numbered three), a priest of the Magi named Artaban, one of the Medes from Persia. Like the other Magi, he sees signs in the heavens proclaiming that a King has been born among the Jews. Like them, he sets out to see the newborn ruler, carrying treasures to give as gifts to the child - a sapphire, a ruby, and a "pearl of great price". However, he stops along the way to help a dying man, which makes him late to meet with the caravan of the other three wise men. Because Artaban missed the caravan and he cannot cross the desert with only a horse, he is forced to sell one of his treasures in order to buy the camels and supplies necessary for the trip. He then re-commences his journey but arrives in Bethlehem too late to see the child, whose parents have fled to Egypt. He saves the life of a child at the price of another of his treasures.

Artaban then travels to Egypt and to many other countries, searching for Jesus for many years and performing acts of charity along the way. After 33 years, Artaban is still a pilgrim and a seeker after light. He arrives in Jerusalem just in time for the crucifixion of Jesus. He spends his last treasure, the pearl, to ransom a young woman from being sold into slavery. Artaban is then struck in the head by a falling roof tile and is about to die, having failed in his quest to find Jesus, but having done much good through charitable works. A voice tells him "Verily I say unto thee, Inasmuch as thou hast done it unto one of the least of these my brethren, thou hast done it unto me." (Matthew 25:40) Artaban dies in a calm radiance of wonder and joy. His treasures were accepted, and the Other Wise Man found his King.

== Other versions ==
- The story has been dramatized as a play several times: by Pauline Phelps in 1951, by Harold G. Sliker in 1952, by Everett Radford in 1956, and by M. Percy Crozier and Margaret Bruce in 1963, among others.
- A television adaptation of the story was presented on the Hallmark Hall of Fame show (starring Wesley Addy as Artaban) in 1953. Televised versions of the story also appeared on Kraft Television Theatre in 1957 (starring Richard Kiley) and on G.E. True Theater in 1960 (starring Harry Townes). A full-length (73 minutes) television movie, titled The Fourth Wise Man, starring Martin Sheen, was broadcast on 30 March 1985.
- An animated version of the story was produced by Bonneville Communications in 1989.
- An oratorio or liturgical opera based on the story was written by Susan Hulsman Bingham and premiered in 2000.
- A chamber opera was written by M. Ryan Taylor and premiered in 2006.
- An opera was written by Damjan Rakonjac with a libretto by David Wisehart and premiered in 2010.
- A simplified version of the tale, intended for children, was written by Robert Barrett in 2007.
- A painting of Artaban was made by Scottish artist Peter Howson for use by the First Minister of Scotland, Alex Salmond, as his 2013 official Christmas card.
- A novel by Edzard Schaper written in 1961: Der vierte König.

== Commentary ==
- "I do not know where this little story came from--out of the air, perhaps. One thing is certain, it is not written in any other book, nor is it to be found among the ancient lore of the East. And yet I have never felt as if it were my own. It was a gift, and it seemed to me as if I knew the Giver." —Henry Van Dyke
- "So beautiful and so true to what is best in our natures, and so full of the Christmas spirit, is this story of The Other Wise Man that it ought to find its way into every sheaf of Christmas gifts in the land."—Harper's New Monthly Magazine
- "What Van Dyke created was a story so simply and beautifully told that the reader is unaware that this recreation of the world our Lord knew is undergirded by prodigious research. It is an awesome tour de force."—Joe L. Wheeler, Christmas in My Heart

== Namesake ==
A large star sapphire, the Star of Artaban, was named for this story. It is currently found at the Smithsonian National Museum of Natural History.
