= FDIC (disambiguation) =

FDIC may refer to:

- Federal Deposit Insurance Corporation, a U.S. government organ, deposit insurer and bank regulator
- FDIC International (Fire Department Instructors Conference), an annual firefighting conference and exhibition
- Front for the Defence of Constitutional Institutions (FDIC: French: Front pour la défense des institutions constitutionnelles), a Moroccan political party
- National Razor (band), also known as F.D.I.C., a U.S. punk band

== See also ==
- Rodriguez v. FDIC, a U.S. Supreme Court case, which made a determination on the Bob Richards Rule
