= Trusty (band) =

American punk band

- Origin: Little Rock, Arkansas
- Genres: Punk
- Years active: 1989–1998, 2008
- Labels: Dischord, Max Recordings, Soma Records, Truant Records, DC-Jam Records
- Members: Bobby Matthews - Guitar, Vocals; James Brady - Guitar, vocals Brad Long - Bass; Jim Schaffer - Drums
- Past members: Paul Bowling - Bass Bircho Birch - Drums
- Website: dcjamrecords.com

Trusty is an American punk band formed in Little Rock, Arkansas, in 1989. The band moved from Little Rock to Washington, D.C., in 1992. The group disbanded in early 1998.

== History ==
=== The Little Rock Years ===
In 1989, the original Trusty lineup released the 7-inch EP "A Name to Depend On" on Soma Records. They followed this with a self-titled LP on Truant Records. Truant pressed only 1,000 copies of the record, but then re-released it as a CD with bonus tracks under the name of The Paul Years - A Trusty Retrospective. In the spring of 1992, the band recorded 7-inch EP Cockatoo with Josh Bentley (of The Big Cats and Substance) on bass, before relocating to the Washington, D.C. area.

In 1994 and again in 1999, the original four members of Trusty reunited and played shows in Little Rock. This lineup (Bobby Matthews, James Brady, Bircho, and Paul Bowling) reunited in 2004 to work on a CD called Sugar Smack, featuring two new tracks and a collection of unreleased outtakes. It was eventually released on Max Recordings.

=== The D.C. Years ===
Between 1992 and 1996, Trusty worked to gain respect and recognition from the established D.C. punk rock scene. In the summer of 1992, Trusty recorded the 7-inch EP Kathy's Keen on De Soto Records with their original drummer, Bircho. In the fall of 1992, with new bassist Brad Long (formerly of the Memphis hardcore band Sobering Consequences) and steady drummer Jim Schaffer (formerly of Washington D.C.–based band Senator Flux), Trusty continued touring and writing songs for their CD Goodbye Dr. Fate, as well as several compilation CDs. Goodbye Dr. Fate was completed in the winter of 1994 and released in the spring of 1995 on Dischord Records. After extensive touring, Trusty released The Fourth Wise Man in 1996 also on Dischord and continued to tour within North America and Europe. Four years after moving from Little Rock, Trusty became the first band originating from outside Washington, D.C. to be signed by Dischord Records.

=== Breakup and After ===
In early 1998, Trusty disbanded. Bobby Matthews now sings and plays guitar in the Memphis-based band Dragoon, along with former Grifters members Tripp Lamkins and Stan Gallimore. Jim Schaffer has been playing drums with the Baltimore punk rock band, National razor, since 2002.

Trusty's song, "Goodbye, Dr. Fate," was included on the 2002 Dischord Records compilation, 20 Years of Dischord.

In 2008, Trusty signed with DC-Jam Records to re-release Demo, their first songs ever recorded (prior to being signed by Dischord).

== Discography ==
- Demo, 1987
- A Name to Depend On (EP), Soma Records, 1989
- Trusty, Truant Records, 1990
- Cockatoo (EP), Sidekick Records, 1993
- The Paul Years (1989-1991): A Trusty Retrospective, Truant Records, 1994
- "Goodbye, Dr. Fate", Dischord Records, 1995
- The Fourth Wise Man, Dischord Records, 1996
- Sugar Smack, Max Recordings, 2006
- Demo, DC-Jam Records, 2008
