= Star of Bombay =

Star sapphire from Sri Lanka

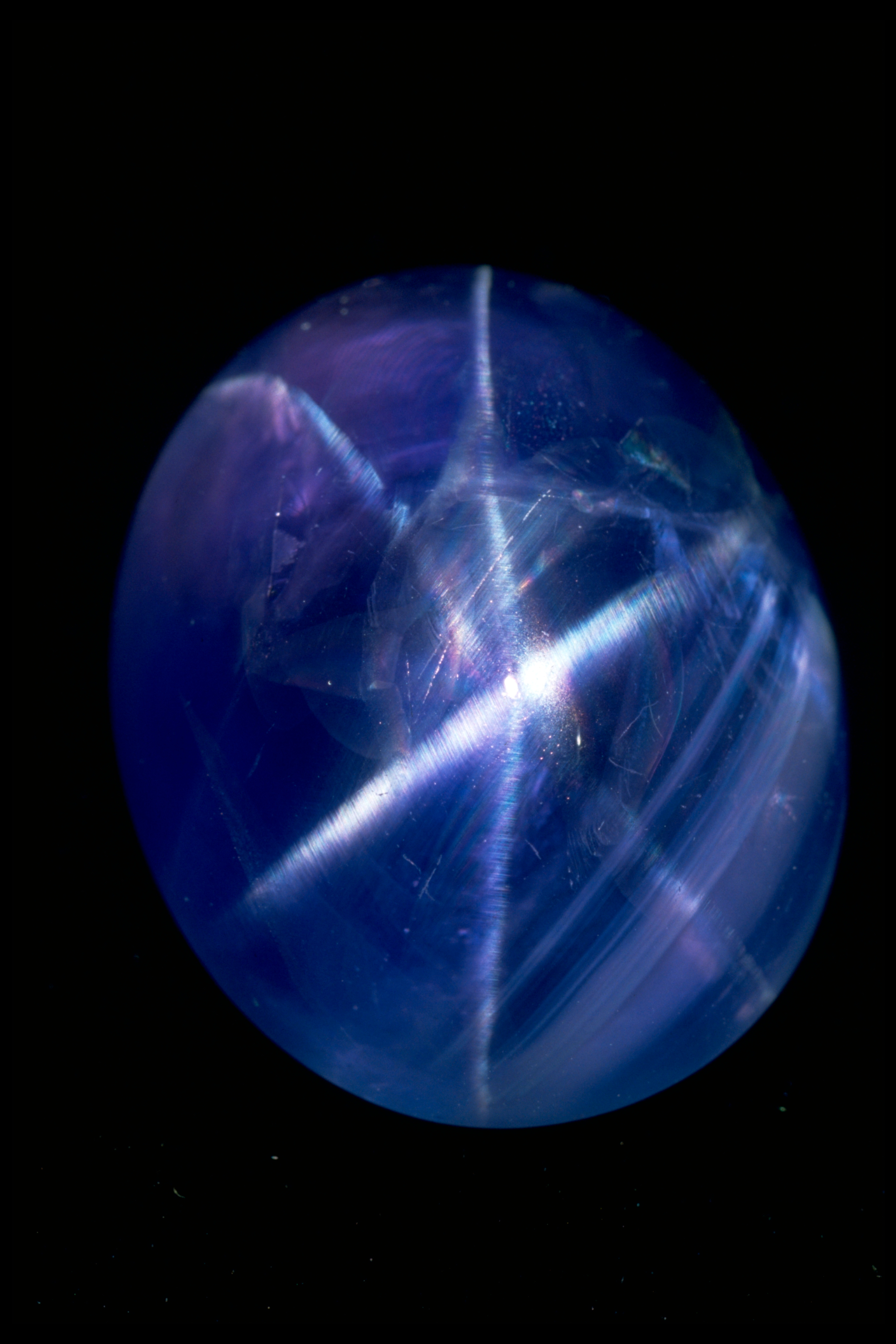
- The 182-carat (36.4-g) Star of Bombay
- Weight: 182 carats (36.4 g)
- Color: Violet-blue
- Cut: Cabochon
- Country of origin: Sri Lanka
- Owner: Smithsonian Institution
- Current location: National Museum of Natural History, Smithsonian Institution

The Star of Bombay is a 182-carat (36.4-g) cabochon-cut star sapphire originating in Sri Lanka. The violet-blue gem was given to silent film actress Mary Pickford by her husband, Douglas Fairbanks. She bequeathed it to the Smithsonian Institution. It is the namesake of the popular alcoholic beverage Bombay Sapphire, a British-manufactured gin.

== Description ==
The Star of Bombay is a 182 carat (36.4-g) cabochon-cut star sapphire. According to Southern Jewelry News, "The Star of Bombay sapphire belongs to the mineral species corundum. Pure corundum is colorless, but trace amounts of transition elements like vanadium or chromium result in different colors in the crystal. The Star of Bombay’s violet-blue color is caused by the presence of titanium and iron giving the blue tint, and vanadium contributing to its violet back color."

== History ==
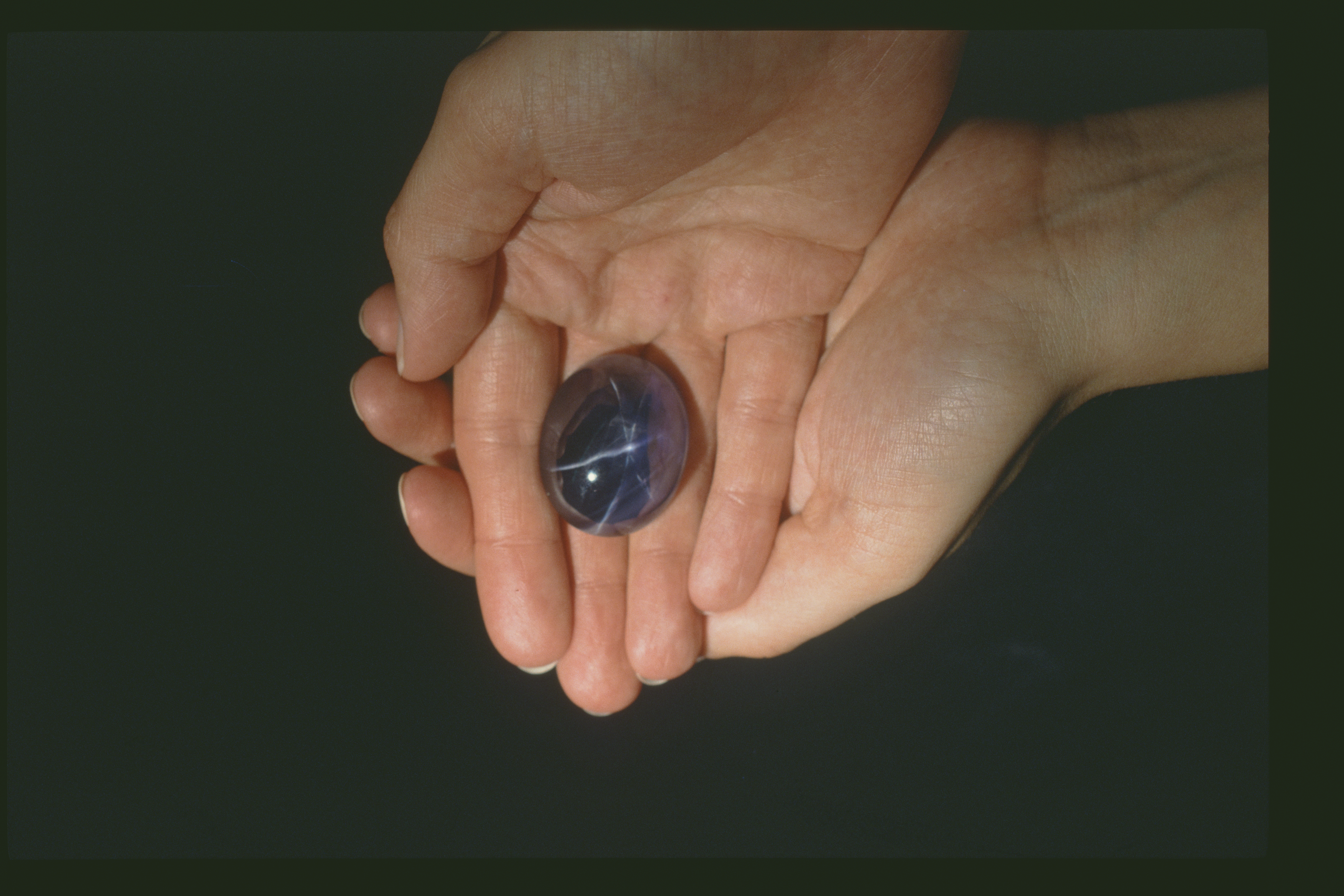
A Smithsonian Institution photograph of the Star of Bombay being held

The Star of Bombay originates from Sri Lanka and is one of the largest star sapphires which have names unrelated to their origin, the other being the Star of India. It is the namesake of the popular alcoholic beverage Bombay Sapphire, a British-manufactured gin. The gem was first acquired by Trabert & Hoeffer Inc. of Park Avenue in New York City and was set in a platinum ring. It is believed that the ring was purchased by Douglas Fairbanks, a famous silent film movie star and that he gave the ring to Mary Pickford. A 1935 advertisement for the Star of Bombay had it listed at 60 carats and did not include information on its origins and described it as "In all the world the only one".

In 1979, Mary Pickford died and bequeathed the Star of Bombay to the Smithsonian Museum. Edward Stotsenberg of the Mary Pickford Foundation called the Smithsonian and a representative was sent out to examine the stone. According to Stotsenberg, the representative stated that the Star of Bombay was much brighter than other stones and pried it from the clasps and returned to the Smithsonian with it. The gem is currently displayed in the Smithsonian's National Museum of Natural History, in the Janet Annenberg Hooker Hall of Geology, Gems and Minerals.

== See also ==
- Star of India (gem)
- Star of Artaban
- Star of Asia
- List of individual gemstones
- List of sapphires by size
