= The Hymn of Joy =

1907 poem by Henry van Dyke

- by Henry van Dyke
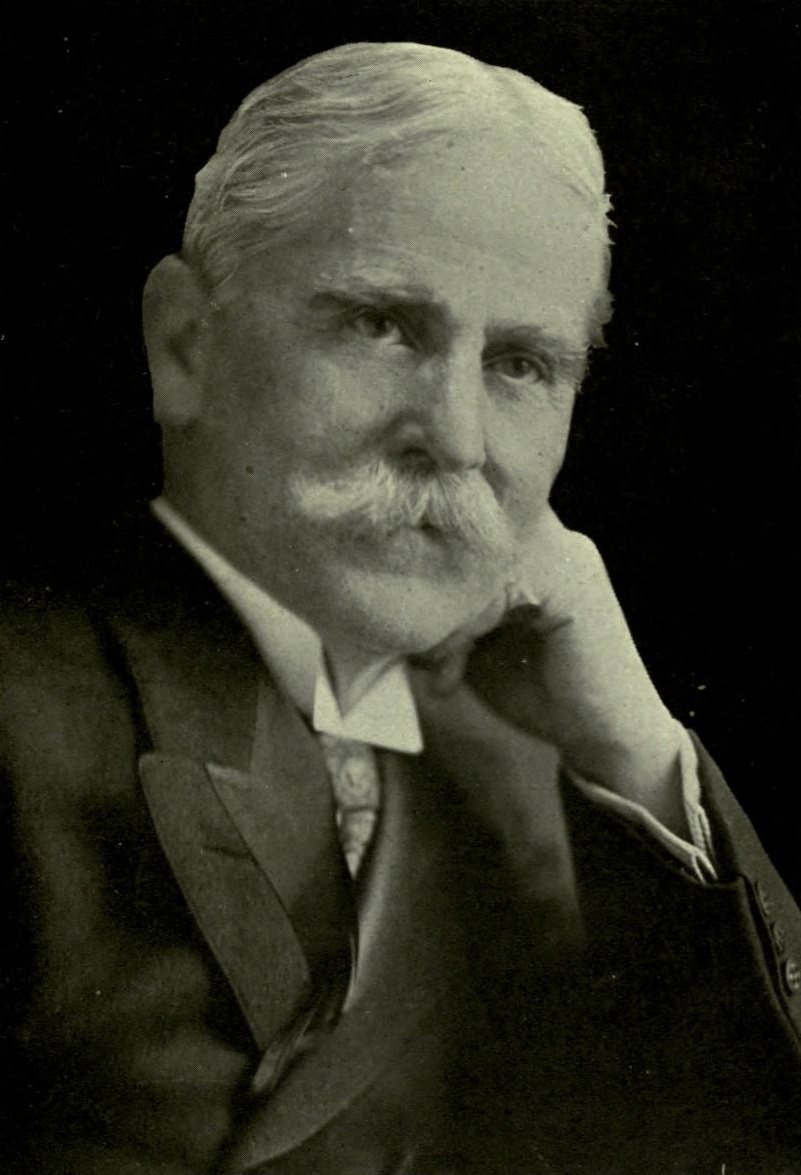
- Henry van Dyke
- Genre: Hymn
- Written: 1907
- Based on: Ode an die Freude by Friedrich Schiller Ode to Joy
- Meter: 8.7.8.7 D
- Melody: "Ode to Joy" by Ludwig van Beethoven

"The Hymn of Joy" (often called "Joyful, Joyful We Adore Thee" after the first line) is a poem written by Henry van Dyke in 1907 sung to the melody of the final movement of Ludwig van Beethoven'sSymphony No. 9.

== Background ==
Van Dyke wrote this poem in 1907 while staying at the home of Williams College president Harry Augustus Garfield while serving as a guest preacher at the college. He told his host that the local Berkshire Mountains had been his inspiration.

The lyrics were first published in 1911 in Van Dyke's Book of Poems, Third Edition.

Van Dyke wrote of this hymn:

These verses are simple expressions of common Christian feelings and desires in this present time—hymns of today that may be sung together by people who know the thought of the age, and are not afraid that any truth of science will destroy religion, or any revolution on earth overthrow the kingdom of heaven. Therefore this is a hymn of trust and joy and hope.

It is well known as a Christian song for children.

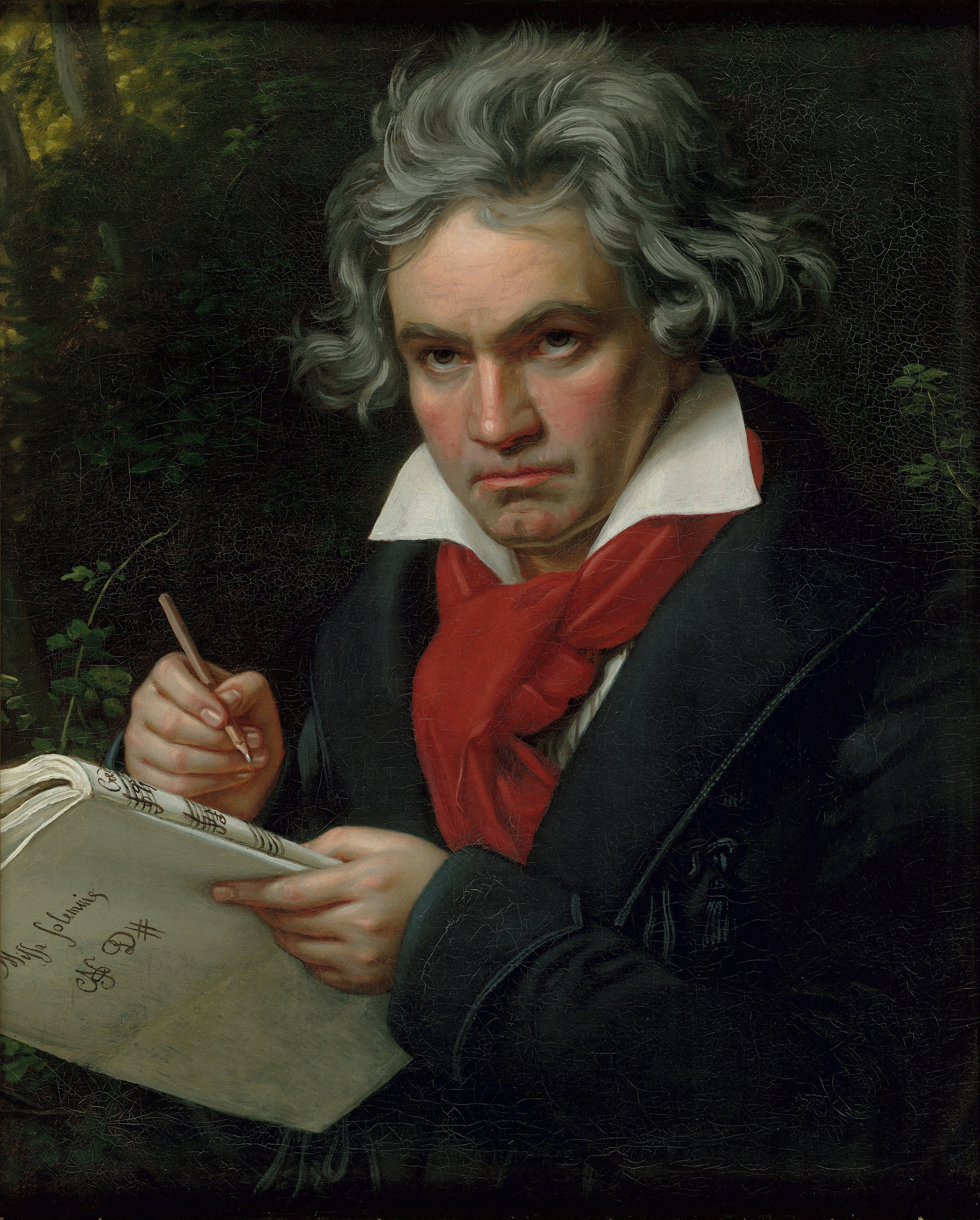
Ludwig van Beethoven in 1820

== Original text ==
Joyful, joyful, we adore Thee
God of glory, Lord of love
Hearts unfold like flow'rs before Thee
Op'ning to the Sun above
Melt the clouds of sin and sadness
drive the dark of doubt away
Giver of immortal gladness
fill us with the light of day

All Thy works with joy surround Thee
Earth and heav'n reflect Thy rays
Stars and angels sing around Thee
center of unbroken praise
Field and forest, vale and mountain
Flow'ry meadow, flashing sea
chanting (Note: Some hymnals: "singing") bird and flowing fountain
call us to rejoice in Thee

Thou art giving and forgiving
ever blessing, ever blest
well-spring of the joy of living
ocean-depth of happy rest
Thou the (Note: Some hymnals: "our") Father, Christ our Brother—
all who live in love are Thine
Teach us how to love each other
lift us to the Joy Divine

Mortals join the mighty (Note: Some hymnals: "happy") chorus
which the morning stars began
Father-love (Note: Some hymnals: "Love Divine" (United Methodist Hymnal) or "God's own love") is reigning o'er us
brother-love binds man to man. (Note: Some hymnals: "binding all within its span" (United Methodist Hymnal) or "joining people hand in hand")
Ever singing, march we onward
victors in the midst of strife
joyful music lifts us sunward
in the triumph song of life
