= Smithsonian Ocean Portal =

The Smithsonian Ocean Portal is an educational website created and maintained by the Smithsonian Institution's National Museum of Natural History in Washington, DC. The website features regularly updated, original content from the museum's research, collections, and Sant Ocean Hall as well as content provided by a number of collaborating organizations. According to the site's statement of purpose, the Ocean Portal was created to "help increase public knowledge about the ocean and marine science, raise public awareness of the ocean's importance to all life, and inspire millions of online visitors to become caring ocean stewards." Supported by private donations, the Ocean Portal is designed to appeal to a broad audience, but the primary audiences are young adults, ocean enthusiasts, educators, and children ages 9–13.

The Ocean Portal represents the third pillar of the National Museum of Natural History's Ocean Initiative, created to further the museum's mission to increase ocean awareness and stewardship. The other pillars of the initiative include the Sant Ocean Hall, the museum's largest exhibition to date, and the Sant Chair for Marine Science, currently filled by marine biologist Dr. Nancy Knowlton. The National Museum of Natural History (NMNH) cares for an estimated 126 million specimens, approximately 94% of all Smithsonian collections. About one-third of NMNH collections and staff focus on the marine realm. NMNH houses the world's largest marine collection, originating from marine research efforts that date back 160 years.

== History ==
In a first for any Smithsonian Institution website, the Smithsonian Ocean Portal is built on a LAMP architecture using the free, open-source software called Drupal. The New York-based web developer Funny Garbage designed and built the Smithsonian Ocean Portal. The Beta version of the website went live in December 2009. Three months later, in March 2010, the National Museum of Natural History launched What Does It Mean to Be Human?, its second Drupal website and the online companion to the David H. Koch Hall of Human Origins. For several months in early 2010 the Ocean Portal site was tested among specific audiences while development continued. The Beta site launched to the broader public on June 2, 2010 as part of the celebration of World Oceans Day on June 8.

=== Awards ===
- The Ocean Portal received a 2010 "People's Voice" Webby Award for "Best Cultural Institution Website"
- The Ocean Portal won two 2010 Communicator Awards: The Award of Excellence for Websites for Charitable Organizations/Non-Profit and the Award of Excellence for Websites for Cultural Institutions.

== Structure ==
The Portal is divided into several sections, including "Ocean Life and Ecosystems," "Ocean Science," "Ocean Over Time," and "Photo Essays." Popular topic areas include the Ocean Portal Blog, the Great White Shark, the Giant Squid, Deep Ocean Exploration, Top Predators Over Time, Coral Reefs, and the Gulf Oil Spill. Users are encouraged to comment on and rate pages, and also encouraged to provide feedback via survey forms and email. Users are also encouraged to join/follow the Ocean Portal on Facebook and Twitter. In addition, the Ocean Portal has several special sections, such as:

=== For Educators ===
The "For Educators" section offers classroom activities, lessons, and educational resources that are teacher-tested and correlate with the Ocean Literacy Principles developed in accordance with National Science Education Standards. The educator materials represent some of the best resources available by subject from the Ocean Portal's collaborators. The materials are available in the Educators' section, but also integrated throughout the site on species, ecosystem, and other subject pages. The educational materials can be filtered by grade, subject, and topic.

=== Ocean & You ===
The Ocean & You section examines the impact of human activities and choices on the global ocean system. It features content on subjects like the Gulf Oil Spill, Climate Change, and Sustainable Seafood. Discussions of human impacts are also integrated throughout the site on pages dedicated to specific species and ecosystems, such as Mangroves, Coral Reefs, and the Great White Shark.

=== Find Your Blue ===
This section offers specific actions that people can take to have a positive impact on the global ocean system, including "Featured Actions" such as Be Kind to the Beach, Stop Slow Oil Leaks, and Steer Clear of Coral Souvenirs. It offers ways for Ocean Portal users to participate through various Flickr groups like "Trash or Treasure?", and by sharing ideas, thoughts, and comments on a range of issues. Activities are frequently linked to subjects explored in the blog and related to the actions and initiatives of collaborating organizations.

== Smithsonian contributors ==
Several Smithsonian organizations contribute to the Ocean Portal, including the Smithsonian Tropical Research Institute in Panama, the Smithsonian Environmental Research Center in Maryland, the Smithsonian Marine Science Network, the Smithsonian Marine Station at Fort Pierce, Florida, the Caribbean Coral Reef Ecosystems Program in Belize, and the National Zoo in Washington, D.C.

In addition, the Smithsonian Ocean Portal collaborates with several non-Smithsonian organizations, which contribute content and expertise to the site.
