= Star of Asia =

330 carat sapphire

The 330 carat Star of Asia in the National Museum of Natural History, Washington D.C., is an excellent example of a blue star sapphire.

The Star of Asia is a large, 330 carats (66 g) cabochon-cut star sapphire now in the Smithsonian National Museum of Natural History. It is noted for its significant size and is considered to be one of the largest of its type. Adding to its aesthetic value are its rich blue colour and clear star, formed from three intersecting rutile striations.

The stone was mined in Sri Lanka and was co-owned by the Kohinoor Trading Company and King's Jewelers of Colombo, Sri Lanka. It was brought to the U.S. in 1950 for display at the first United States International Trade Fair in Chicago. By 1958, it was for sale through consignment in London, and was eventually purchased by a Swiss-American named Jack Mason.

In 1961, it was resold to the Smithsonian Institution in exchange for a parcel of small faceted diamonds. The seller, a mineral dealer named Martin Ehrmann acting on behalf of Jack Mason, invented a history for the stone to increase the sale value. He claimed that it had been mined from the Mogok mines of Burma and had at one point been owned by the Maharaja of Jodhpur. This story was repeated by the curators of the Smithsonian for decades, until the true history was discovered through contacting the family of the original owners.

== See also ==
- Star of Adam
- Star of Artaban
- Star of Bombay
- Star of India (gem)
- List of individual gemstones
- List of sapphires by size
