= The Fourth Wise Man =

- Screenplay by: Tom Fontana
- Story by: Henry van Dyke Jr.
- Directed by: Michael Ray Rhodes
- Starring: Martin Sheen; Eileen Brennan; Alan Arkin
- Theme music composer: Bruce Langhorne; Chris Stone
- Country of origin: United States
- Original language: English

Production
- Producers: Lewis Abel; Michael Ray Rhodes
- Cinematography: Jon Kranhouse
- Editor: Mark Goldberg
- Running time: 72 minutes
- Production company: Paulist Productions

Original release
- Network: ABC
- Release: March 30, 1985

The Fourth Wise Man is a 1985 American television film directed by Michael Ray Rhodes and starring Martin Sheen, Eileen Brennan and Alan Arkin.

The story was adapted from Henry van Dyke Jr.'s 1895 short story, The Other Wise Man.

== Cast ==
- Martin Sheen as Artaban
- Adam Arkin as Joseph
- Eileen Brennan as Judith
- Ralph Bellamy as Abgarus
- Richard Libertini as Tigranes
- Lance Kerwin as Passhur
- Harold Gould as Rabbi
- Alan Arkin as Orontes
- Greg Mullavey as Rhodespes
- James Farentino as Jesus (voice)
- Ramon Estevez as Ekron
