= Henry van Dyke Jr. =

American diplomat (1852–1933)

The Reverend Henry van Dyke Jr.
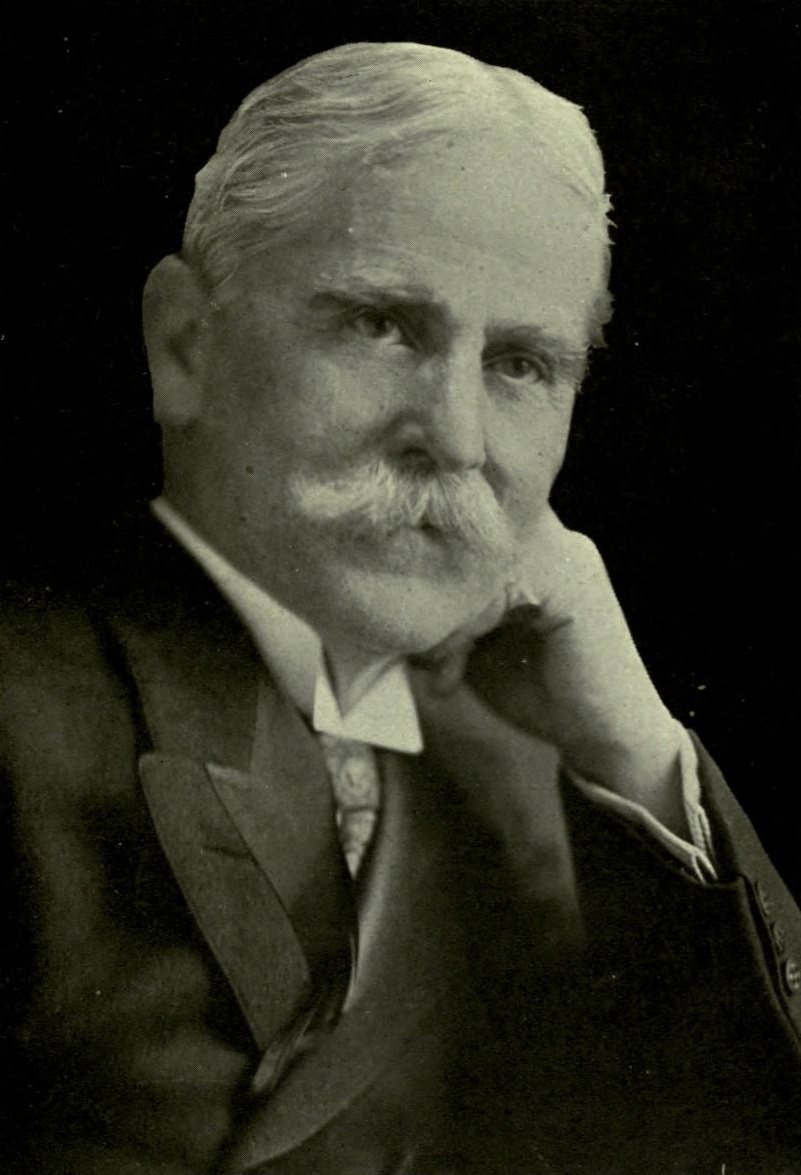

United States Ambassador to Luxembourg
- In office November 20, 1913 – January 15, 1917
- President: Woodrow Wilson
- Preceded by: Lloyd Bryce
- Succeeded by: John W. Garrett

United States Ambassador to the Netherlands
- In office October 15, 1913 – January 11, 1917
- President: Woodrow Wilson
- Preceded by: Lloyd Bryce
- Succeeded by: John W. Garrett

Personal details
- Born: Henry Jackson van Dyke Jr. November 10, 1852 Germantown, Pennsylvania, U.S.
- Died: April 10, 1933 (aged 80) Princeton, New Jersey, U.S.
- Resting place: Princeton Cemetery
- Spouse: Ellen Reid
- Parent: Henry van Dyke Sr.
- Education: Poly Prep Country Day School
- Alma mater: Princeton University; Princeton Theological Seminary
- Occupation: Author; educator; minister; diplomat

Henry Jackson van Dyke Jr. (November 10, 1852 – April 10, 1933) was an American author, educator, diplomat, and Presbyterian clergyman.

== Early life ==
Van Dyke was born on November 10, 1852, in Germantown, Pennsylvania. He was the son of Henry Jackson van Dyke Sr. (1822–1891), a prominent Brooklyn Presbyterian clergyman known in the antebellum years for his anti-abolitionist views. The family traced its roots to Jan Thomasse van Dijk, who emigrated from Holland to North America in 1652.

The younger Henry van Dyke graduated from Poly Prep Country Day School in 1869, Princeton University, in 1873 and from Princeton Theological Seminary, 1877.

== Career ==
He served as a professor of English literature at Princeton between 1899 and 1923. Among the many students whom he influenced was, notably, future celebrity travel writer Richard Halliburton (1900–1939), editor-in-chief, at the time, of the Princeton Pictorial.

Van Dyke chaired the committee that wrote the first Presbyterian printed liturgy, The Book of Common Worship of 1906. In 1908–09 Dr. van Dyke was a lecturer at the University of Paris.

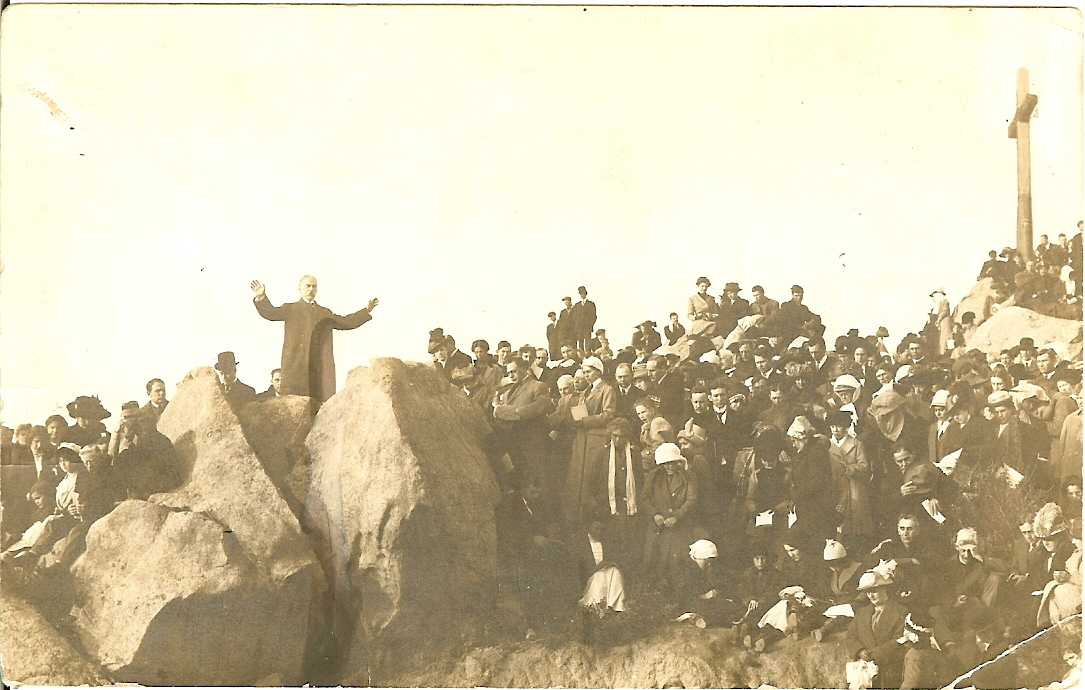
Henry van Dyke offering prayer at the 1913 Easter Sunrise Services in Riverside, California, atop Mount Rubidoux

By appointment of President Woodrow Wilson, a friend and former classmate of van Dyke, he became Minister to the Netherlands and Luxembourg in 1913. Shortly after his appointment, World War I threw Europe into dismay. Americans all around Europe rushed to Holland as a place of refuge. Although inexperienced as an ambassador, van Dyke conducted himself with the skill of a trained diplomat, maintaining the rights of Americans in Europe and organizing work for their relief. He later related his experiences and perceptions in the book Pro Patria (1921).

Van Dyke resigned as ambassador at the beginning of December 1916 and returned to the United States. He was subsequently elected to the American Academy of Arts and Letters and received many other honors.

Van Dyke was a friend of Helen Keller. Keller wrote: "Dr. van Dyke is the kind of a friend to have when one is up against a difficult problem. He will take trouble, days and nights of trouble, if it is for somebody else or for some cause he is interested in. 'I'm not an optimist,' says Dr. van Dyke, 'there's too much evil in the world and in me. Nor am I a pessimist; there is too much good in the world and in God. So I am just a meliorist, believing that He wills to make the world better, and trying to do my bit to help and wishing that it were more.'"

He officiated at the funeral of Mark Twain at the Brick Presbyterian Church on April 23, 1910.

Van Dyke died on April 10, 1933. He is buried in Princeton Cemetery. A biography of Van Dyke, titled Henry Van Dyke: A Biography, was written by his son Tertius van Dyke and published in 1935.

== Literary legacy ==
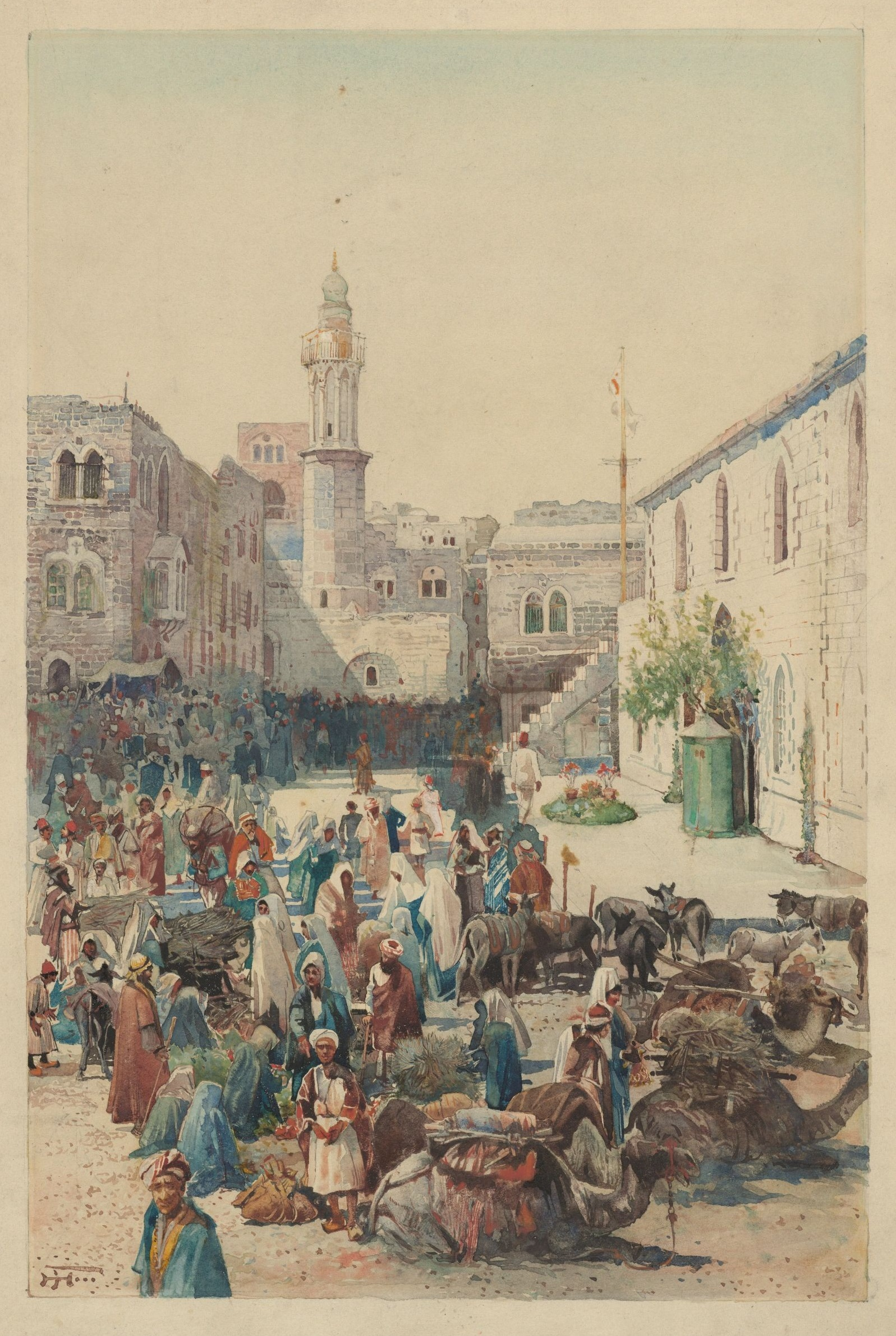
Illustration by Harry Fenn from Out-of-Doors in the Holy Land, 1908

Among his popular writings are the two Christmas stories, "The Other Wise Man" (1896) and "The First Christmas Tree" (1897). Various religious themes of his work are also expressed in his poetry, hymns and the essays collected in Little Rivers (1895) and Fisherman's Luck (1899). He wrote the lyrics to the popular hymn "Joyful, Joyful We Adore Thee" (1907), sung to the tune of Beethoven's "Ode to Joy". He compiled several short stories in The Blue Flower (1902), named after the key symbol of Romanticism introduced first by Novalis. He also contributed a chapter to the collaborative novel, The Whole Family (1908).

One of van Dyke's best-known poems is titled "Time Is" (Music and Other Poems, 1904), also known as "For Katrina's Sundial" because it was composed to be an inscription on a sundial in the garden of an estate owned by his friends Spencer and Katrina Trask. The second section of the poem, which was read at the funeral of Diana, Princess of Wales, reads as follows:

Time is
Too slow for those who Wait,
Too swift for those who Fear,
Too long for those who Grieve,
Too short for those who Rejoice,
But for those who Love,
Time is not.

(This is the original poem; some versions have "Eternity" in place of "not.")

The poem inspired the song "Time Is" by the group It's a Beautiful Day on their eponymous 1969 debut album. Another interpretation of the poem is a song entitled "Time" by Mark Masri (2009).

In 2003, the same section of the poem was chosen for a memorial in Grosvenor Square, London, dedicated to British victims of the September 11, 2001 terrorist attacks.

== List of works ==
=== Short stories ===
- Among The Quantock Hills, from Days Off and Other Digressions
- Antwerp Road
- The Art of Leaving Off, from Days Off and Other Digressions
- Ashes of Vengeance (a half-told tale)
- Beggars Under the Bush
- Between The Lupin and The Laurel, from Days Off and Other Digressions
- The Blue Flower
- Books That I Loved as a Boy, from Days Off and Other Digressions
- The Boy of Nazareth Dreams
- A Brave Heart, from The Ruling Passion collection
- The Broken Soldier and the Maid of France
- A Change of Air
- A City of Refuge
- A Classic Instance
- The Countersign of The Cradle
- Days Off, from Days Off and Other Digressions
- Diana and the Lions (a half-told tale)
- A Dream-story: The Christmas Angel
- The Effectual Fervent Prayer
- The First Black Christmas
- The First Christmas-Tree
- A Friend of Justice, from The Ruling Passion collection
- The Gentle Life, from The Ruling Passion collection
- A Handful Of Clay
- The Hearing Ear
- The Hero and Tin Soldiers
- His Other Engagement, from Days Off and Other Digressions
- A Holiday in a Vacation, from Days Off and Other Digressions
- Humoreske
- In the Odour of Sanctity
- Justice of the Elements (a half-told tale)
- The Keeper of the Light, from The Ruling Passion collection
- The Key of the Tower
- The King's High Way
- The King's Jewel
- Leviathan, from Days Off and Other Digressions
- Little Red Tom, from Days Off and Other Digressions
- The Lost Boy
- The Lost Word: A Christmas Legend of Long Ago
- A Lover of Music, from The Ruling Passion collection
- Lucifer's Virgin Body
- The Mansion, Christmas story
- Messengers at the Window
- The Mill
- The Music-Lover
- The New Era and Carry On (a half-told tale)
- The Night Call
- Notions About Novels, from Days Off and Other Digressions
- An Old Game
- The Other Wise Man
- Out-Of-Doors in the Holy Land
- The Primitive and His Sandals (a half-told tale)
- Ships and Havens
- A Remembered Dream
- The Return of the Charm
- The Reward of Virtue, from The Ruling Passion collection
- The Ripening of the Fruit
- The Sad Shepherd, Christmas story
- Salvage Point
- A Sanctuary of Trees
- Silverhorns, from Boy Scouts' Book of Campfire Stories
- Sketches of Quebec
- Some Remarks On Gulls, from Days Off and Other Digressions
- Songs Out of Doors (Poems) small (duodecimo?) volume published by Scribner's, 1922
- The Source
- Spy Rock
- Fighting For Peace
- Stronghold
- The Traitor in the House (a half-told tale)
- The Unruly Sprite, a Partial Fairy Tale
- The Wedding-Ring
- What Peace Means
- The White Blot, from The Ruling Passion collection
- Wood-Magic
- Helps to Happiness (contains selections of his work as permitted)
- A Year of Nobility, from The Ruling Passion collection
- The Red Flower
- Doors of Daring

Scribner's Sons published The Works of Henry Van Dyke, 16 volumes, in 1920; it is known as the Avalon Edition.

=== Essays ===
- The Americanism of George Washington (1906)

== Archival collections ==
The Presbyterian Historical Society has a collection of Van Dyke's sermons, notes and addresses from 1875 to 1931. The collection also includes two biographical essays and a poem from 1912.

Diplomatic posts
Preceded by Lloyd Bryce	U.S. Ambassador to the Netherlands; 1917–1919	Succeeded by John W. Garrett
