= National Razor (band) =

American punk rock band

National Razor (also known as National Razor, F.D.I.C.) is an American punk rock band that formed in 1998 in Baltimore, Maryland. Influenced by Stiff Little Fingers, The Clash, the Ramones, they experimented with new wave and hardcore. For their early recording career, the band consisted of Erik Sunday (lead vocals, bass guitar), Frank Burgess (lead guitar, occasional lead vocals), Dee Settar (rhythm guitar, occasional lead vocals), and Morphius Records founder David Andler (drums, backing vocals).

== History ==
National Razor was a success on the U.S. East Coast from the release of their Finally Death Is Coming debut album in 1999. The album received critical acclaim from publications like Maximum Rock'N'Roll and Hit List, and toured the U.S. with Italian hardcore band Raw Power.

Settar left the group shortly after the first album, to be replaced by David Israel (lead guitar, backing vocals). Their next release, Friends Don't Invite Cops (2001), included the anti-drug anthem "Do You Wanna Get High Tonight?", widely considered the band's most meaningful contribution to the lexicon of recorded punk music. The release was packaged together with the UK Subs song "The Revolution's Here", and the two bands performed in the U.S. together on a variety of occasions.

Following performances with many other national acts, including The Casualties, Vice Squad, MDC, Funeral Dress, and others, and a brief 2002 tour, internal friction led to Andler's departure. The group continued with Jim Schaffer (formerly of the punk band Trusty) as his replacement. Burgess left in 2005, to be replaced by Carl from 90s local band Rebel Truce.

Recordings engineered by Charley Jamison in 2003 and 2005 have never been released. The song "123 Go!" was intended to be released on a Ramones tribute compilation by the Chicago-based Full Breach Kicks label which never came out.

Prior to Mapleshade's release of Naked Before God and Country, music photographer and art critic Eldon Baldwin summed the band up as "a surly, uncontrived blend of The Ramones, Stiff Little Fingers, the Beatles, Johnny Cash and The Clash".

The band's politicised lyrics and rebellious attitude influenced the post-2000 resurgence of Baltimore and Washington, D.C., area bands influenced by early US/UK punk rock.

In 2005, Andler reunited with the band for one show at a weekend festival at Talking Head Club in Baltimore, with Schaffer playing bass for most of the set, and played a second drum kit on some songs. This show was also Carl's first with the band. In 2008, Burgess played guitar with the band for one show (opening for Eddie and the Hot Rods at the Sidebar), shortly after becoming a Baltimore City Firefighter. The band continued to play sporadically, and recorded material in 2009 at Sheffield Studios for an (as yet unreleased) album that was to be titled Four Dollars in Change with Drew Mazurek, who also engineered the band's second release. Shows from 2005 to 2016 include opening for The Briefs, Clit 45, The Brutal Dildos, American Distress, The Blood, HR, World Inferno Friendship Society, The Goons, U.S. Bombs, Vice Squad, The Ripovs, So Damn Thirsty, Chelsea Graveyard, Dead Roses, Rustbuckit, the aptly-named "Asshole Fest", and others.

Andler, Sunday, and Carl began recording together again in 2011 at Lord Baltimore Recording. Five songs were recorded, some of which ventured into acoustic and folk-ballad territory, utilizing acoustic guitars and upright bass, while a couple were more in the traditional SLF/Clash vein. A sixth song from this session was a cover of Mega City Four's "Cradle", with vocals not yet recorded at time of writing. All songs from this session remain unfinished and unmixed to varying degrees.

On August 28, 2011, in the midst of Hurricane Irene, Sunday, Israel, Carl, Schaffer, and Andler all shared the stage at Baltimore's Sidebar, opening for The Queers as part of BiMA.fest 2011. A mixture of new and old National Razor material as well as some of the unreleased tracks recorded in 2009 and 2011 were performed, with Andler on drums for the first half the set and Schaffer for the second half. Dave Andler still operates Morphius Records & Lord Baltimore Recording Studio in Baltimore.

In spring of 2016, Frank Burgess permanently re-joined the band. National Razor has been keeping busy rehearsing and writing new material. Further goals for the coming months include recording and releasing new songs alongside the previously unreleased 2009 "Four Dollars in Change" material as a full album, tentatively re-named "Five Dollars in Change".

== Members ==
- Erik Sunday – Bass, lead vocals
- Dave Israel – Guitar, vocals, keyboards
- Jim Schaffer – Drums, vocals
- Frank Burgess – Guitar, vocals

=== Former members ===
- David Andler – Drums, vocals
- Dee Settar – Guitar, vocals
- Carl – Guitar, vocals

== Discography ==
Discography

- Finally Death Is Coming (1999, Morphius)
- "Tear Me Down" on Our Voices Must Be Heard compilation (2000, Silent Records)
- Friends Don't Invite Cops – split release with UK Subs (2001, VMS/Morphius)
- "Do You Wanna Get High Tonight" on Food Not Bombs compilation (2002, Silent Records)
- Naked Before God and Country (2006, Mapleshade Records)
- Unreleased "123 Go!" on Full Breach Kicks Ramones Compilation (Full Breach)
