= National Museum of Natural History =

Natural history museum in Washington, DC

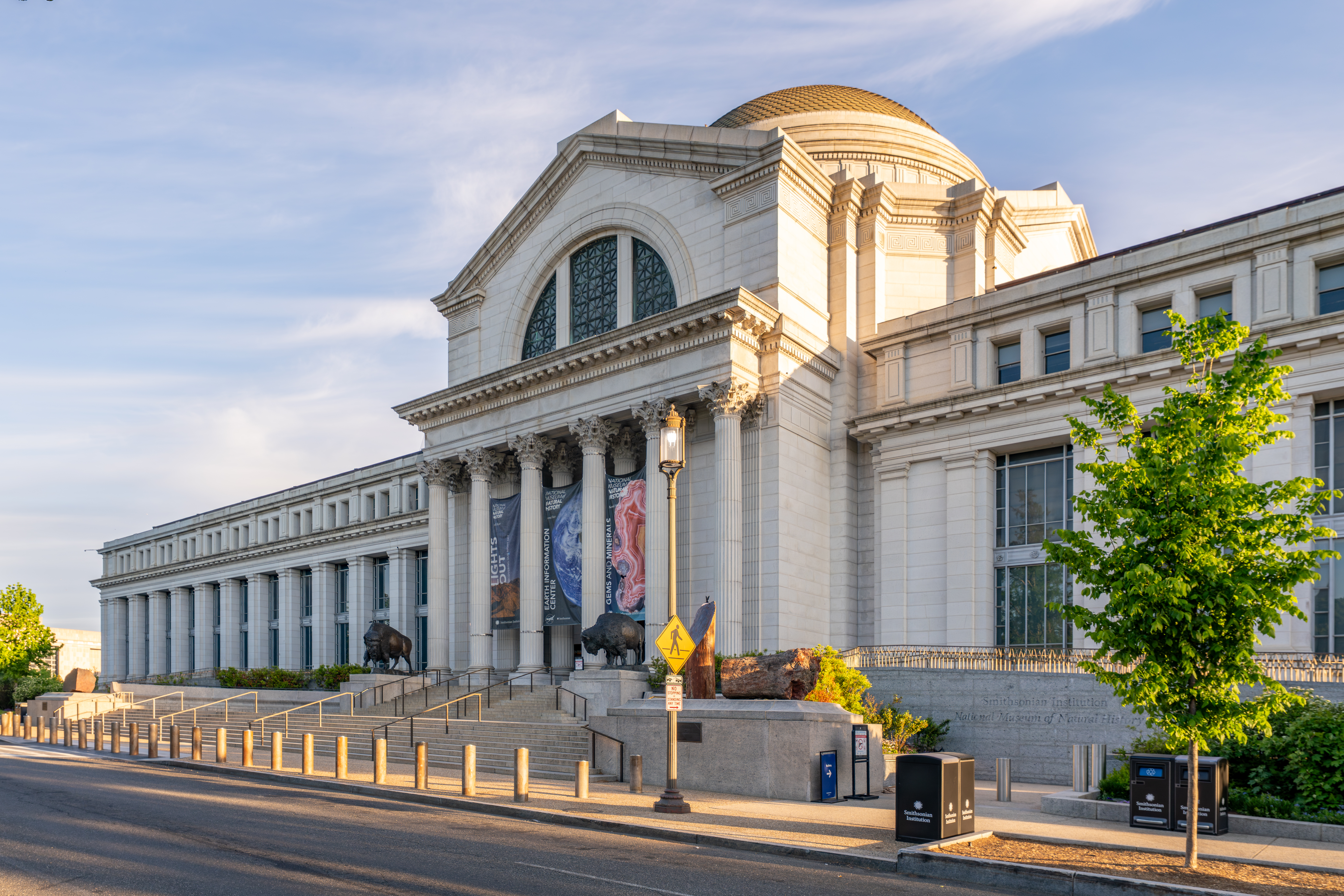
- View of the main façade from Madison Drive
- Established: 1910; 116 years ago
- Location: National Mall in Washington, D.C., United States
- Coordinates: 38.8913°N 77.0259°W
- Type: Natural history museum
- Collection size: 148,000,000 specimens
- Visitors: 3.3 million (2025)
- Director: Kirk Johnson
- Employees: 352 staff (2023); 108 interns
- Public transit access: at Federal Triangle
- Website: naturalhistory.si.edu

The National Museum of Natural History (NMNH) is a natural history museum administered by the Smithsonian Institution, located on the National Mall in Washington, D.C., United States. It has free admission and is open 364 days a year. It received 3.3 million visits in 2025.

Opened in 1910, the museum on the National Mall was one of the first Smithsonian buildings constructed exclusively to hold the national collections and research facilities. The main building has an overall area of 1.5 million square feet (140,000 m^{2}) with 325,000 square feet (30,200 m^{2}) of exhibition and public space and houses over 1,000 employees.

The museum's collections contain over 148 million specimens of plants, animals, fossils, minerals, rocks, meteorites, human remains, and human cultural artifacts, the largest natural history collection in the world. It is also home to about 185 professional natural history scientists—the largest group of scientists dedicated to the study of natural and cultural history in the world.

== History ==
=== 1846–1911 ===
The United States National Museum was founded in 1846 as part of the Smithsonian Institution. The museum was initially housed in the Smithsonian Institution Building, which is better known today as the Smithsonian Castle. A formal exhibit hall opened in 1858. The growing collection led to the construction of a new building, the National Museum Building (known today as the Arts and Industries Building). Covering a then-enormous 2.25 acres (9,100 m^{2}), it was built in just 15 months at a cost of $310,000 (equivalent to $10,342,241 in 2025). It opened in March 1881.

Congress authorized construction of a new building on June 28, 1902. On January 29, 1903, a special committee composed of members of Congress and representatives from the Smithsonian's board of regents published a report asking Congress to fund a much larger structure than originally planned. The regents began considering sites for the new building in March, and by April 12 settled on a site on the north side of B Street NW between 9th and 12th Streets. The D.C. architectural firm of Hornblower & Marshall was chosen to design the structure. Testing of the soil for the foundations was set for July 1903, with construction expected to take three years.

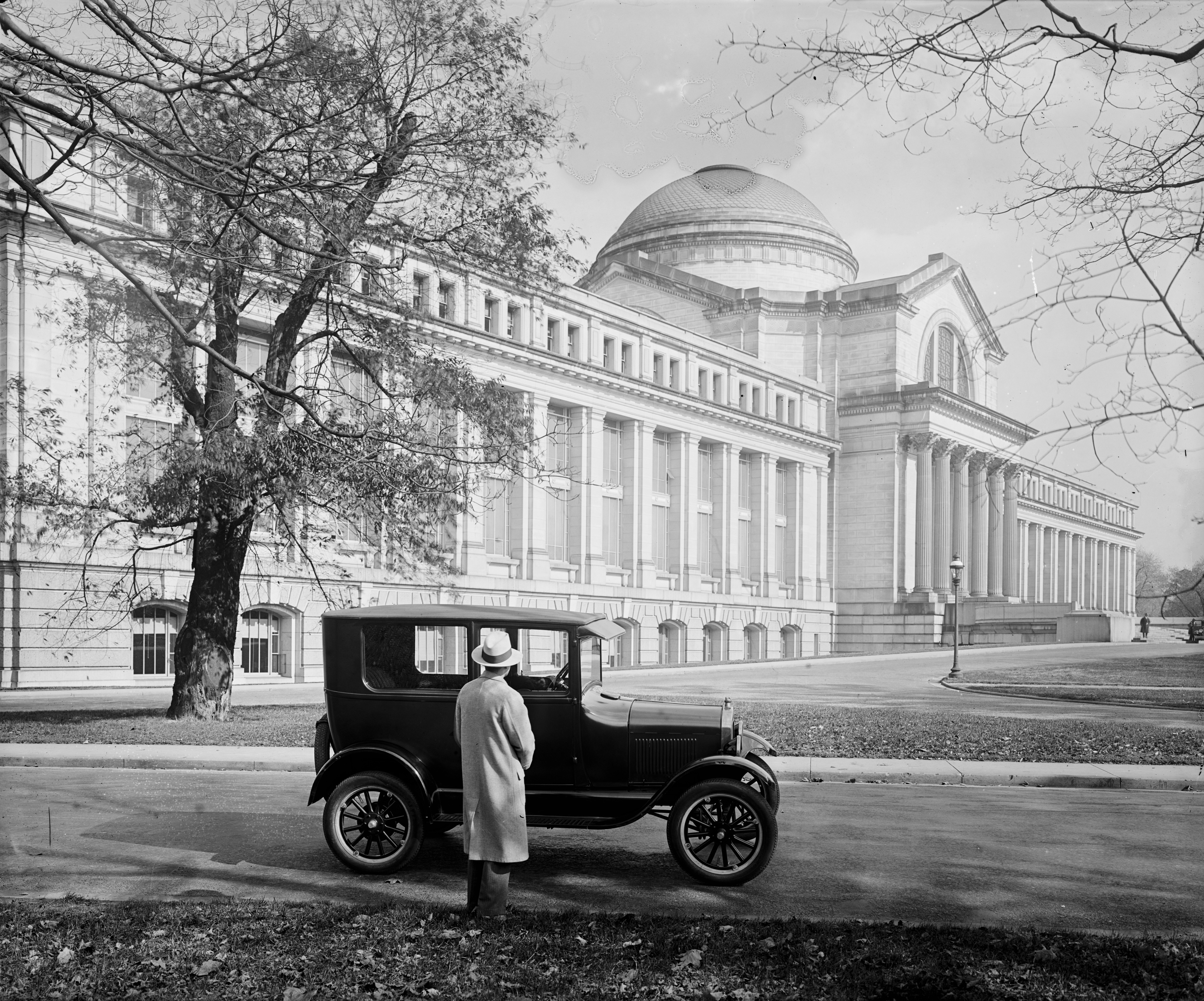
Ford Model T parked in front of the National Museum in 1926

The Natural History Building (as the National Museum of Natural History was originally known) opened its doors to the public on March 17, 1910, in order to provide the Smithsonian Institution with more space for collections and research. The building was not fully completed until June 1911. The structure cost $3.5 million (equivalent to about $121 million today). The Neoclassical style building was the first structure constructed on the north side of the National Mall as part of the 1901 McMillan Commission plan. In addition to the Smithsonian's natural history collection, it also housed the American history, art, and cultural collections.

=== 1981–2003 ===
Between 1981 and 2003, the National Museum of Natural History had 11 permanent and acting directors. The directors included: Richard S. Fiske (1980–1985); James C. Tyler (acting, 1985 and 1988); and Robert S. Hoffmann (1985–1988).

Frank Talbot, ichthyologist and former director of the Australian Museum and California Academy of Sciences, served as director from 1989 until 1994. He was the first (and as of 2024 the only) Australian to ever be appointed to this role.

Two acting directors (Donald J. Ortner, 1994–1996, and David L. Pawson in 1996) served before Robert W. Fri was named the museum's director in 1996. One of the largest donations in Smithsonian history was made during Fri's tenure. Kenneth E. Behring donated $20 million in 1997 to modernize the museum. Fri resigned in 2001 after disagreeing with Smithsonian leadership over the reorganization of the museum's scientific research programs.

J. Dennis O'Connor, provost of the Smithsonian Institution (where he oversaw all science and research programs) was named acting director of the museum on July 25, 2001. Eight months later, O'Conner resigned to become the vice president of research and dean of the graduate school at the University of Maryland. Douglas Erwin, a paleontologist at the National Museum of Natural History, was appointed interim director in June 2002.

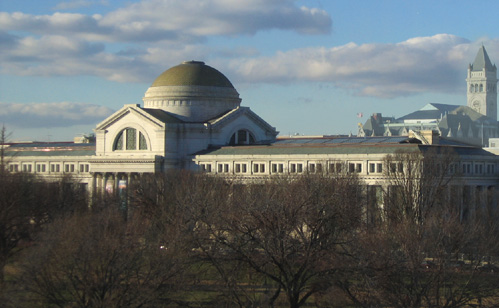
The museum as seen from the National Mall

=== 2003–2007 ===
In January 2003, the Smithsonian announced that Cristián Samper, a Colombian with an M.Sc. and Ph.D. from Harvard University, would become the museum's permanent director on March 31, 2003. Samper (who holds dual citizenship with Colombia and the United States) founded the Alexander von Humboldt Biological Resources Research Institute and ran the Smithsonian Tropical Research Institute after 2001. Smithsonian officials said Samper's administrative experience proved critical in his appointment. Under Samper's direction, the museum opened the $100 million Behring Hall of Mammals in November 2003, received $60 million in 2004 for the Sant Hall of Oceans, and received a $1 million gift from Tiffany & Co. for the purchase of precious gems for the National Gem Collection.

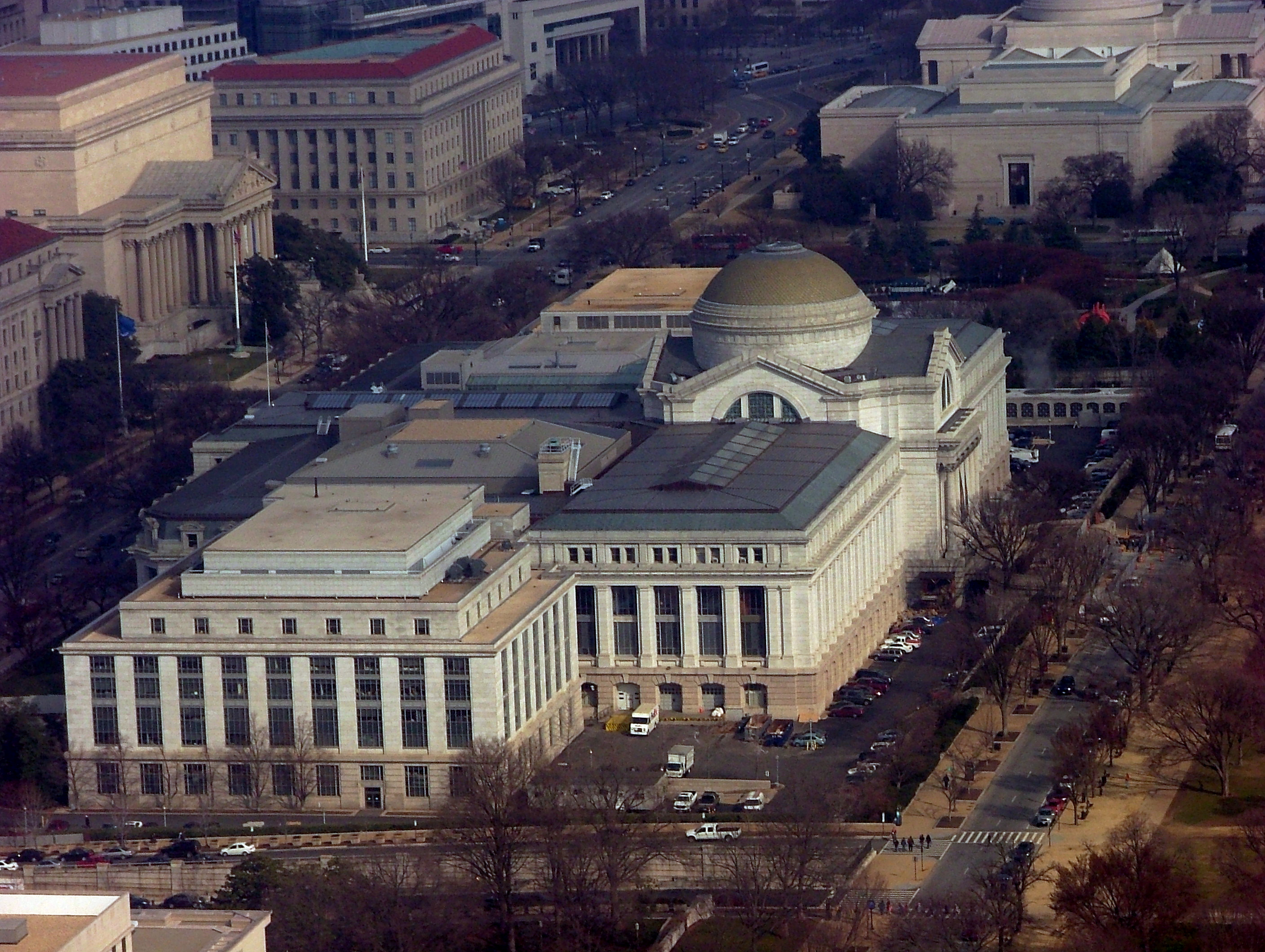
Aerial view, 2008

On March 25, 2007, Lawrence M. Small, Secretary of the Smithsonian Institution and the organization's highest-ranking appointed official, resigned abruptly after public reports of lavish spending.

=== 2007–2012 ===
On March 27, 2007, Samper was appointed Acting Secretary of the Smithsonian. Paul G. Risser, former chancellor of the University of Oklahoma, was named acting director of the Museum of Natural History on March 29.

In May 2007, Robert Sullivan, the former associate director in charge of exhibitions at the National Museum of Natural History, charged that Samper and Smithsonian Undersecretary for Science David Evans (Samper's supervisor) ordered "last minute" changes in the exhibit "Arctic: A Friend Acting Strangely" to tone down the role of human beings in the discussion of global warming, and to make global warming seem more uncertain than originally depicted. Samper denied that he knew of any scientific objections to the changes, and said that no political pressure had been applied to the Smithsonian to make the changes. In November 2007, The Washington Post reported that an interagency group of scientists from the Department of the Interior, NASA, National Oceanic and Atmospheric Administration (NOAA), and National Science Foundation believed that, despite Samper's denial, the museum "acted to avoid criticism from congressional appropriators and global-warming skeptics in the Bush administration". The changes were discussed as early as mid-August 2005, and Dr. Waleed Abdalati, manager of NASA's Cryospheric Sciences Program, noted at the time that "There was some discussion of the political sensitivities of the exhibit."

Although the exhibit was due to open in October 2005, the Post reported that Samper ordered a six-month delay to allow for even further changes. The newspaper also reported that it had obtained a memo drafted by Samper shortly after October 15, 2005, in which Samper said the museum should not "replicate" work by the Intergovernmental Panel on Climate Change. A few weeks later, a NOAA climate researcher advised a superior that the delay was due to "the debate within the administration and the science community over the existence and cause of global warming". During the delay, Samper asked high-level officials in other government agencies and departments to review the script for the exhibit, ordered his museum staff to make additional changes, and rearranged the sequence of the exhibit panels so that the discussion of climate change was not immediately encountered by museum visitors. Shortly before the exhibit opened in April 2006, officials at NOAA and the United States Department of Commerce expressed to their superiors their opinion that the exhibit had been changed to accommodate political concerns. In an interview with The Washington Post in November 2007, Samper said he felt the exhibit displayed a scientific certainty that did not exist, and expressed his belief that the museum should present evidence on both sides and let the public make up its own mind.

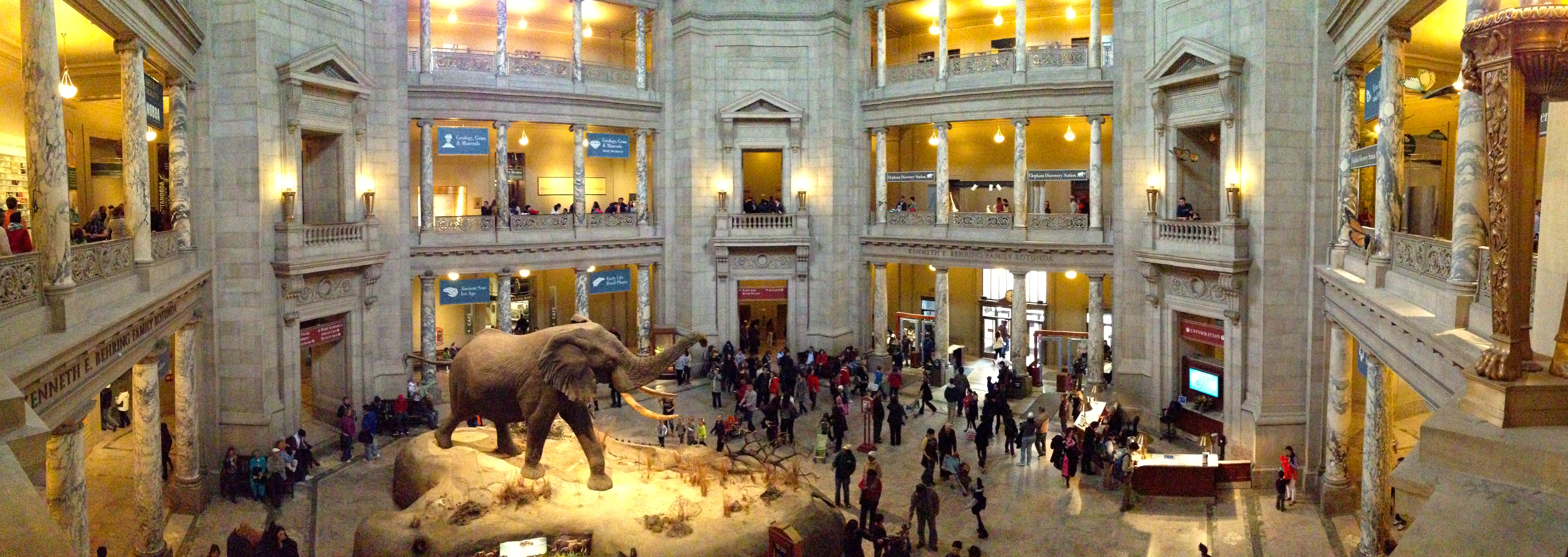
Inside the rotunda

The issue became more heated after the press reported that Samper gave permission for the museum to accept a $5 million donation from American Petroleum Institute that would support the museum's soon-to-be-opened Hall of Oceans. Two members of the Smithsonian Institution's Board of Regents (which had final say on accepting the donation) questioned whether the donation was a conflict of interest. Before the board could consider the donation, the donor withdrew the offer.

Risser resigned as acting director of the museum on January 22, 2008, in order to return to his position at the University of Oklahoma. No new acting director was named at that time. Six weeks later, the Smithsonian regents chose Georgia Tech president G. Wayne Clough as the new Secretary. Samper stepped down to return to his position as Director of the National Museum of Natural History.

In June 2008, the Victoria and Roger Sant family donated $15 million to endow the new Ocean Hall at the museum. The museum celebrated the 50th anniversary of its acquisition of the Hope Diamond in August 2009 by giving the gemstone its own exhibit and a new setting. In March 2010, the museum opened its $21 million human evolution hall.

In January 2012, Samper said he was stepping down from the National Museum of Natural History to become president and chief executive officer of the Wildlife Conservation Society. Two months later, the museum announced it had received a $35 million gift to renovate its dinosaur hall, and a month later the Sant family donated another $10 million to endow the director's position. On July 25, 2012, Kirk Johnson, vice president of research and collections at the Denver Museum of Nature and Science, was named Samper's successor effective October 29, 2012. By 2013, as Sant Director, Johnson oversaw a museum with 460 employees and a $68 million budget. A five-year strategic plan was released in 2021. The museum's Mall building was listed on the National Register of Historic Places in 2023.

== Research and collections ==
VOA report about the museum from 2019

Research in the museum is divided into seven departments: anthropology, botany, entomology, invertebrate zoology, mineral sciences, paleobiology, vertebrate zoology.

The NMNH represents 90% of the Smithsonian Institution's collections and forms one of the largest, most comprehensive natural history collection in the world. The Smithsonian gives an approximate number for artifacts and specimens of 146 million. More specifically, the collections include 30 million insects, 4.5 million plants preserved in the Museum's herbarium, and 7 million fish stored in liquid-filled jars. The National Collection of Amphibians and Reptiles has more than tripled from 190,000 specimen records 1970 to over 580,000 specimen records in 2020. Of the 2 million cultural artifacts, 400,000 are photographs housed in the National Anthropological Archives. Through off-site active loan and exchange programs, the museum's collections can be accessed. As a result, 3.5 million specimens are out on loan every year. The rest of the collections not on display are stored in the non-public research areas of the museum and at the Museum Support Center, located in Suitland, Maryland. Other facilities include a marine science center in Ft. Pierce, Florida and field stations in Belize, Alaska, and Kenya.

The museum is estimated to hold more than 5000 Native American remains that have not been repatriated. Some of these may belong to the Seminole Tribe of Florida.

One collection of nearly a million specimens of birds, reptiles, and mammals kept at the museum has been maintained by the Biological Survey unit of the U.S. Geological Survey. This division had started in 1885 as an economic ornithology unit of the Agriculture Department. Clarence Birdseye and Clinton Hart Merriam had worked in this organization. As of February 2018, the unit's funding is planned to be cut, and it is not clear what would happen to the collection.

== Exhibitions ==
=== Hall of Geology, Gems, and Minerals ===
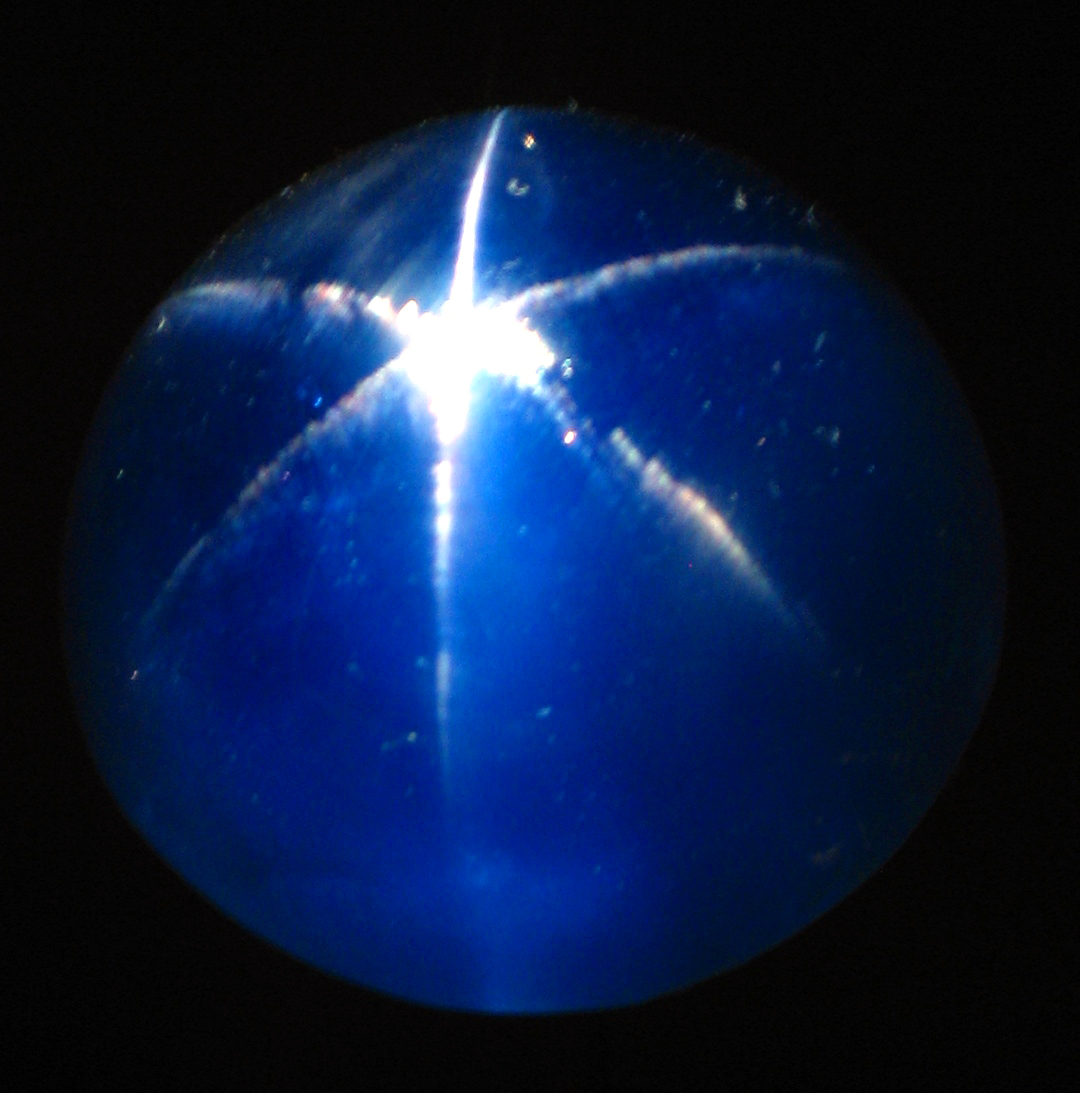
The Star of Asia, a large, 330-carat cabochon-cut star sapphire in the U.S. National Gem and Mineral Collection

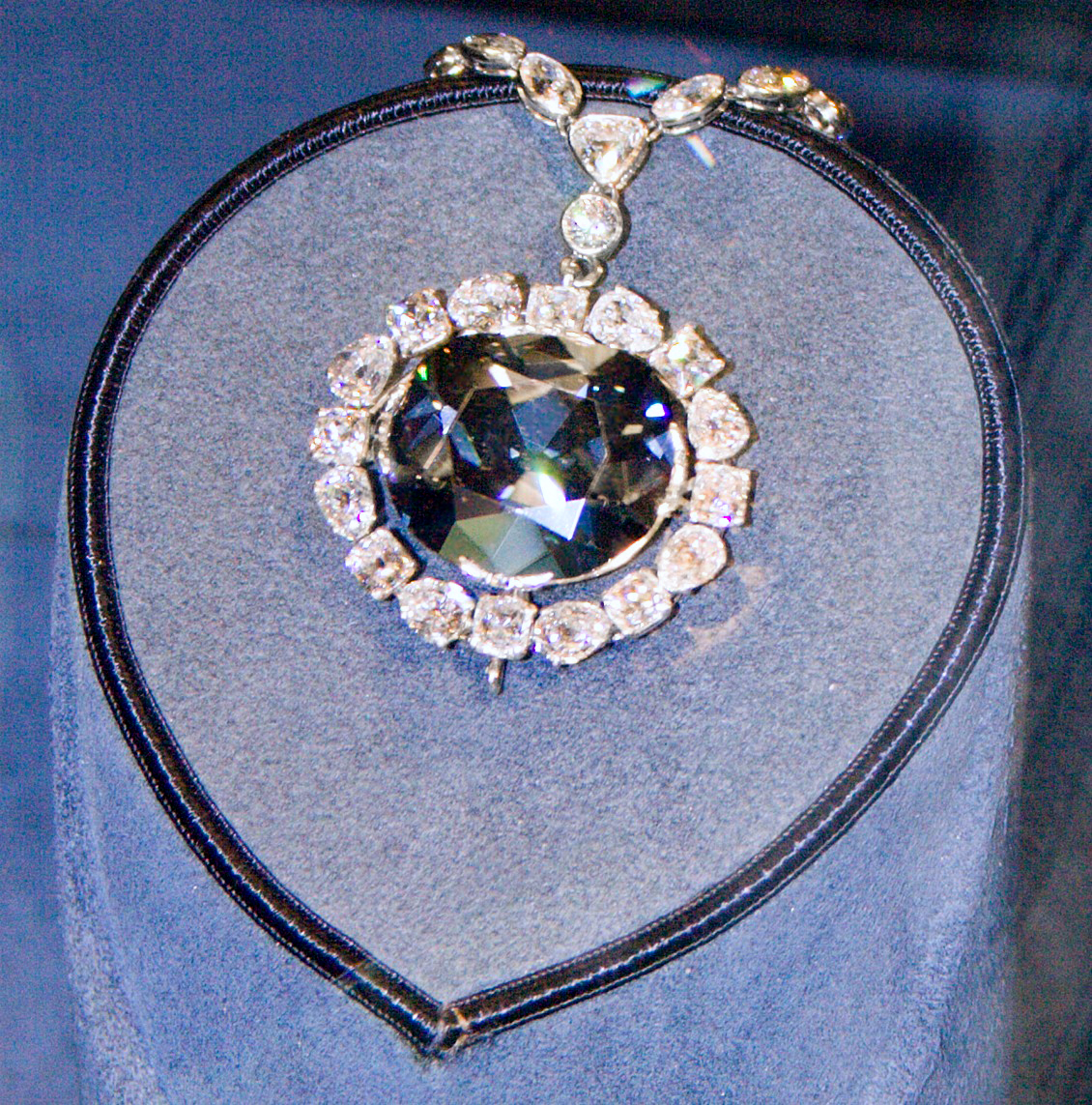
The Hope Diamond

The National Gem and Mineral Collection is one of the most significant collections of its kind in the world. There are currently over 15,000 individual gems in the collection, as well as 350,000 minerals and 300,000 samples of rock and ore specimens. Additionally, the Smithsonian's National Gem and Mineral Collection houses approximately 45,000 meteorite specimens, including examples of every known type of meteorite, and is considered to be one of the most comprehensive collections of its kind in the world. The collection includes some of the most famous pieces of gems and minerals, including the Hope Diamond and the Star of Asia (one of the largest sapphires in the world), and the Carmen Lúcia Ruby, one of the largest and most valuable Burmese rubies in the world.

The collection is displayed in the Janet Annenberg Hooker Hall of Geology, Gems and Minerals, one of the many galleries in the Museum of Natural History. Some of the most important donors, besides Hooker, are Washington Roebling, the man who built the Brooklyn Bridge, who gave 16,000 specimens to the collection; Frederick A. Canfield, who donated 9,000 specimens to the collection; and Isaac Lea, who donated the basis of the museum's collection of 1312 gems and minerals.

=== Hall of Human Origins ===
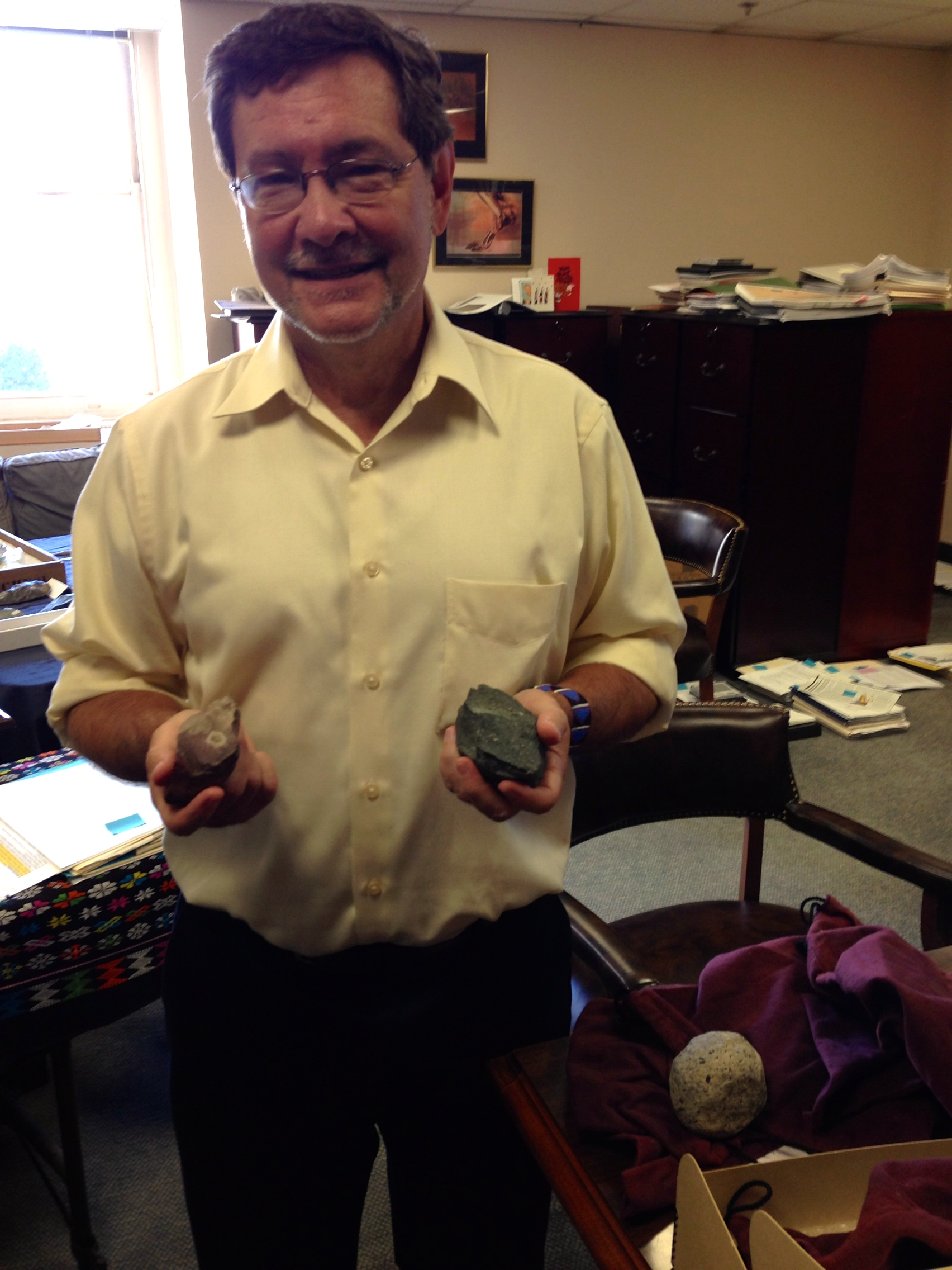
Rick Potts, head of Smithsonian Human Origins project

The David H. Koch Hall of Human Origins opened on March 17, 2010, marking the museum's 100th anniversary. The hall is named for David H. Koch, who contributed $15 million to the $20.7 million exhibit.

The Hall is "dedicated to the discovery and understanding of human origins," and occupies 15,000 square feet (1,400 m^{2}) of exhibit space. This exhibit includes 76 humans skulls, each of a different species, eons apart. Each of these species is a human, signified by the "Homo" genus name. One species that can be found in this gallery is the Homo heidelbergensis, which lived 200,000–700,000 years ago. In addition, there is a female skull from Homo floresiensis, a human species that possibly only went extinct just 17,000 years ago. The exhibit includes an interactive human family tree that follows six million years of evolution, and a "Changing the World" gallery that focuses on issues surrounding climate change and humans' impact on the world. The Hall's core concept idea is "What Does It Mean To Be Human", and focuses on milestones of human evolution such as walking upright, bigger brains, and symbolic thought. Also covered is the Smithsonian's significant research on the geological and climate changes which occurred in East Africa during significant periods of Human Evolution. The exhibit highlights an actual fossil Neanderthal and replicas created by famed paleoartist, John Gurche. The exhibit has been criticized for downplaying the significance of human-caused global warming.

The exhibit also provides a complementary web site, which provides diaries and podcasts directly from related fields of research. The companion book, What Does It Mean To Be Human, was written by Richard (Rick) Potts, the curator, and Christopher Sloan. The exhibit was designed by Reich + Petch.

=== Deep Time Exhibit/Fossil Hall ===
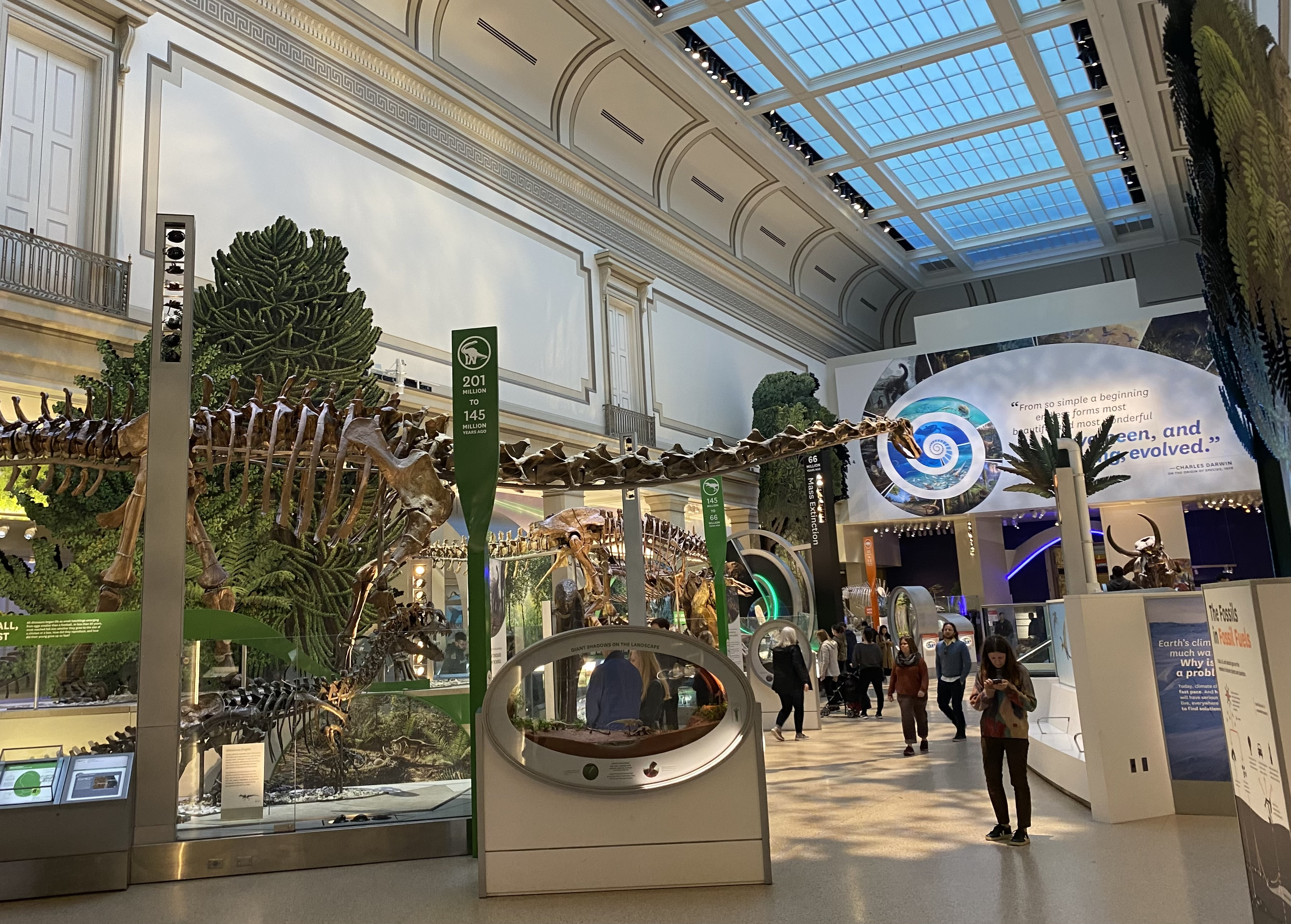
Deep Time exhibit, prominently featuring a Diplodocus skeleton

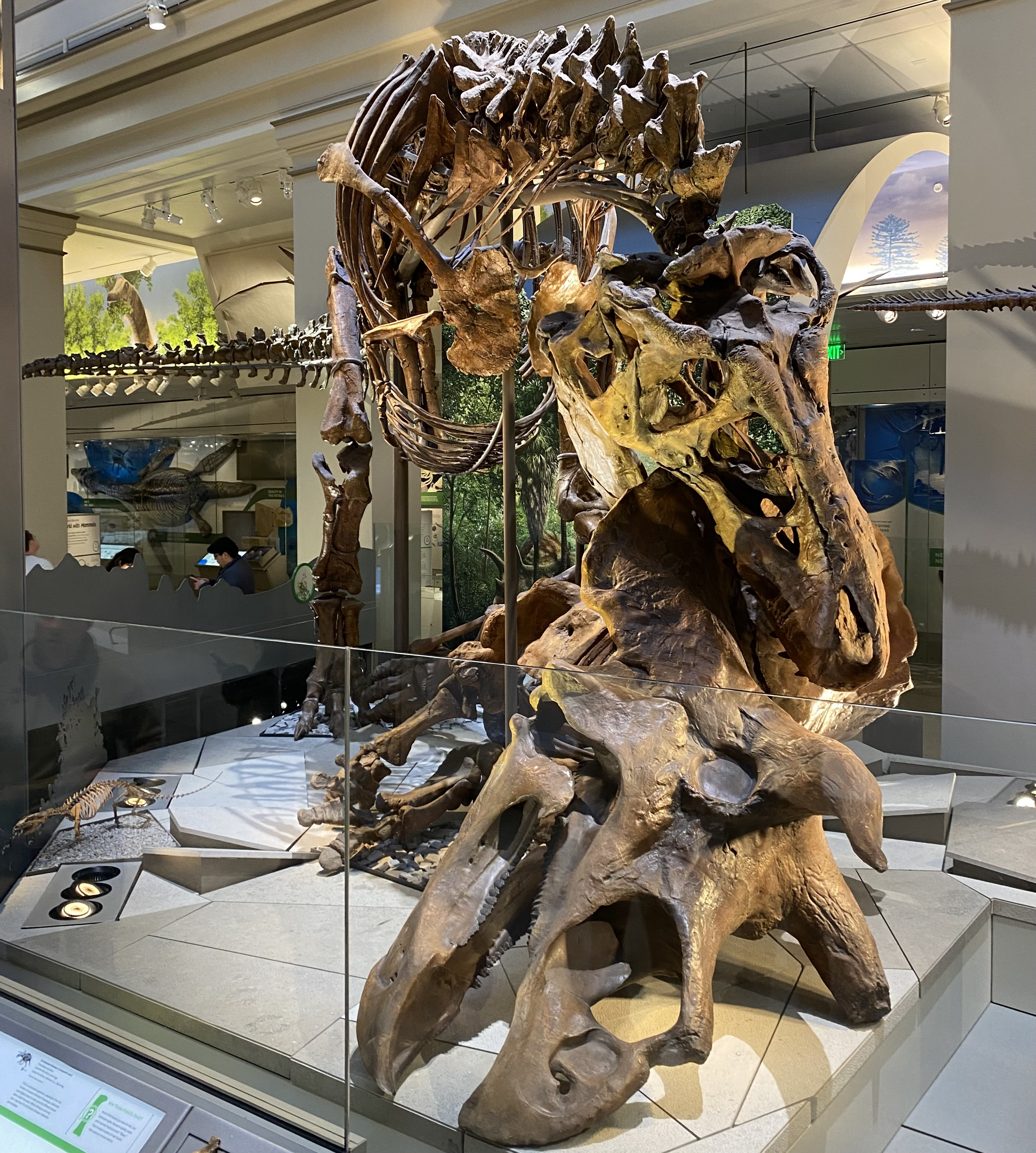
Tyrannosaurus rex in the Deep Time exhibit, depicted preying on Triceratops

A FossiLab volunteer uses lab equipment to sift through collected sediments for bone particles at the Smithsonian National Museum of Natural History.

The Hall of Dinosaurs has fossilized skeletons and cast models, including a Tyrannosaurus rex cast facing a Triceratops cast. This Triceratops exhibit shows the first accurate dinosaur skeleton in virtual motion, achieved through the use of scanning and digital technology." The collection consists of 46 "complete and important specimens" of dinosaurs.

In May 2012, billionaire David H. Koch donated $35 million toward the cost of a $45 million upgrade to the 30-year-old, 25,000 square feet (2,300 m^{2}) dinosaur hall. The hall closed in April 2014 and reopened in June 2019.

In June 2013, the Smithsonian obtained a 50-year lease on a T. rex fossil skeleton owned by the United States Army Corps of Engineers. It is the first T. rex skeleton to be displayed at the museum, which until now has only had the cast of a skull. The specimen, known as the "Wankel" or "Devil" rex, was found on Corps-owned land in the Charles M. Russell National Wildlife Refuge in Montana in 1988. It has since been on display at the Museum of the Rockies in Bozeman, Montana (which helped excavate the fossil). The "Wankel rex" (whose skeleton is 85 percent complete) was to be unveiled at the Museum of Natural History on National Fossil Day, October 16, 2013, and was supposed to be on display until the dinosaur hall exhibit closed for renovation in the spring of 2014. The 35-foot (11 m) long skeleton is the centerpiece of the dinosaur hall since it re-opened in 2019. The Museum of the Rockies (which did not own the skeleton but was the repository for it) has about a dozen T. rex specimens, including one which is eighty percent complete. Only about six museums in the United States have a T. rex skeleton. The Museum of the Rockies is a Smithsonian affiliate museum, and had long promised to find a T. rex for the Smithsonian to display.

Due to the 2013 federal government shutdown, the fossil did not arrive in Washington, D.C. Smithsonian officials said it remained in storage in Montana, and would not arrive at the Smithsonian until late spring 2014. Packed up in 16 crates, the T. rex, named "Nation's T. rex" by the Smithsonian, traveled from the Museum of the Rockies and arrived at the National Museum of Natural History on April 15, 2014. The T. rex was displayed in the Rex Room, while specialists performed a conservation assessment and the Smithsonian Digitization Program scanned each bone, to create a 3-D model for research. The Nation's T. rex is the centerpiece of the new fossil hall, which opened in 2019.

=== Hall of Mammals ===
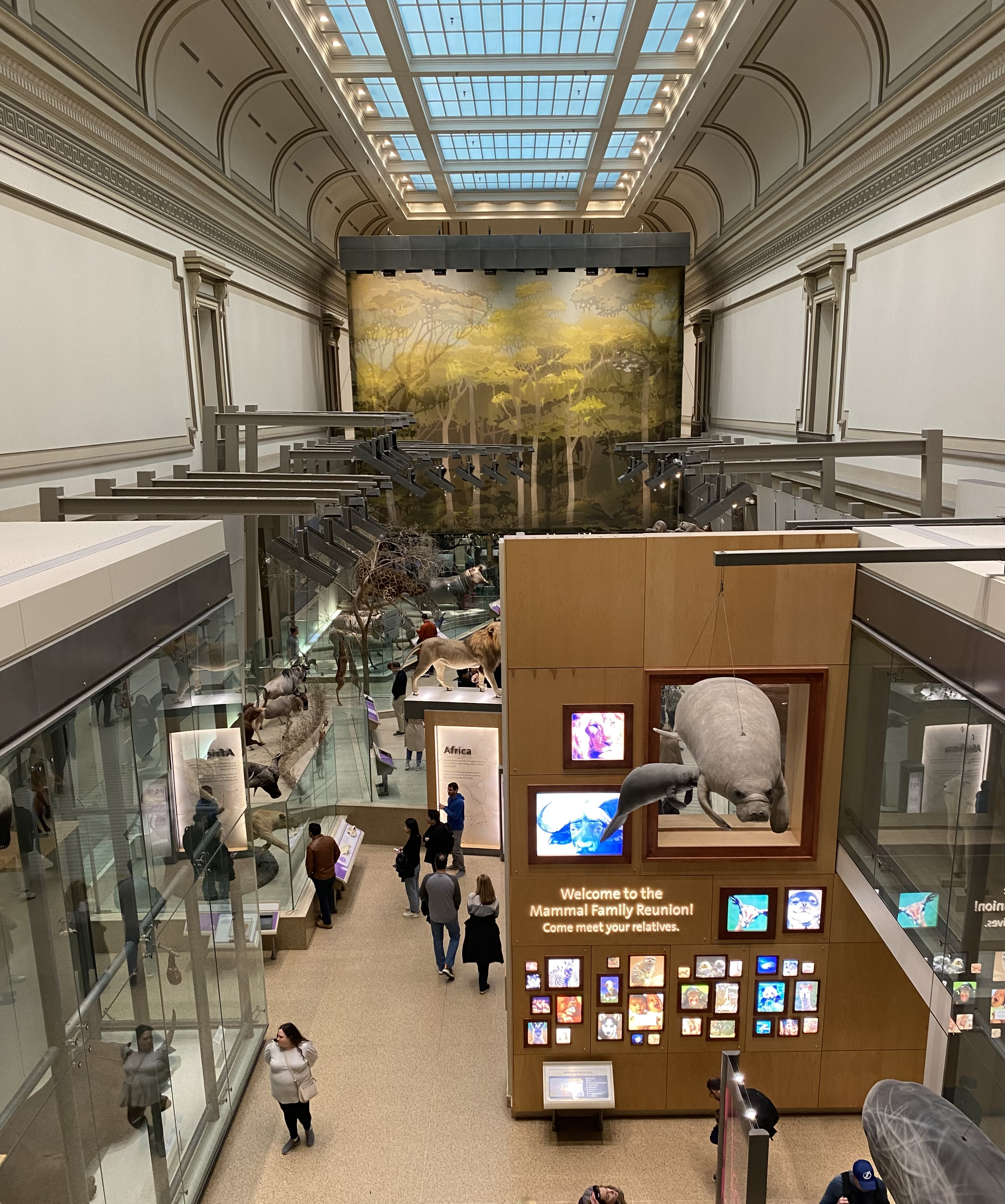
View of the Hall of Mammals from above

The Behring Hall of Mammals was designed by Reich + Petch. The mammal specimens are presented as works of modern art within minimal environmentals. Visitors discover mammal's evolutionary adaptions to hugely diverse contexts.

The museum has the largest collection of vertebrate specimens in the world, nearly twice the size of the next largest mammal collections, including historically important collections from the nineteenth and early twentieth centuries. Its collection was initiated by C. Hart Merriam and the U.S. Department of Agriculture (later the Department of the Interior), which expanded it in the 1890s-1930s.

=== Insect Zoo ===
The O. Orkin Insect Zoo features live insects and exhibits about insects and entomologists. Different habitats have been created to show the type of insects that live in different environments and how they have adapted to a freshwater pond, house, mangrove swamp, desert, and rain forest. The zoo is sponsored by Orkin, a pest control company.

=== Ocean Hall ===
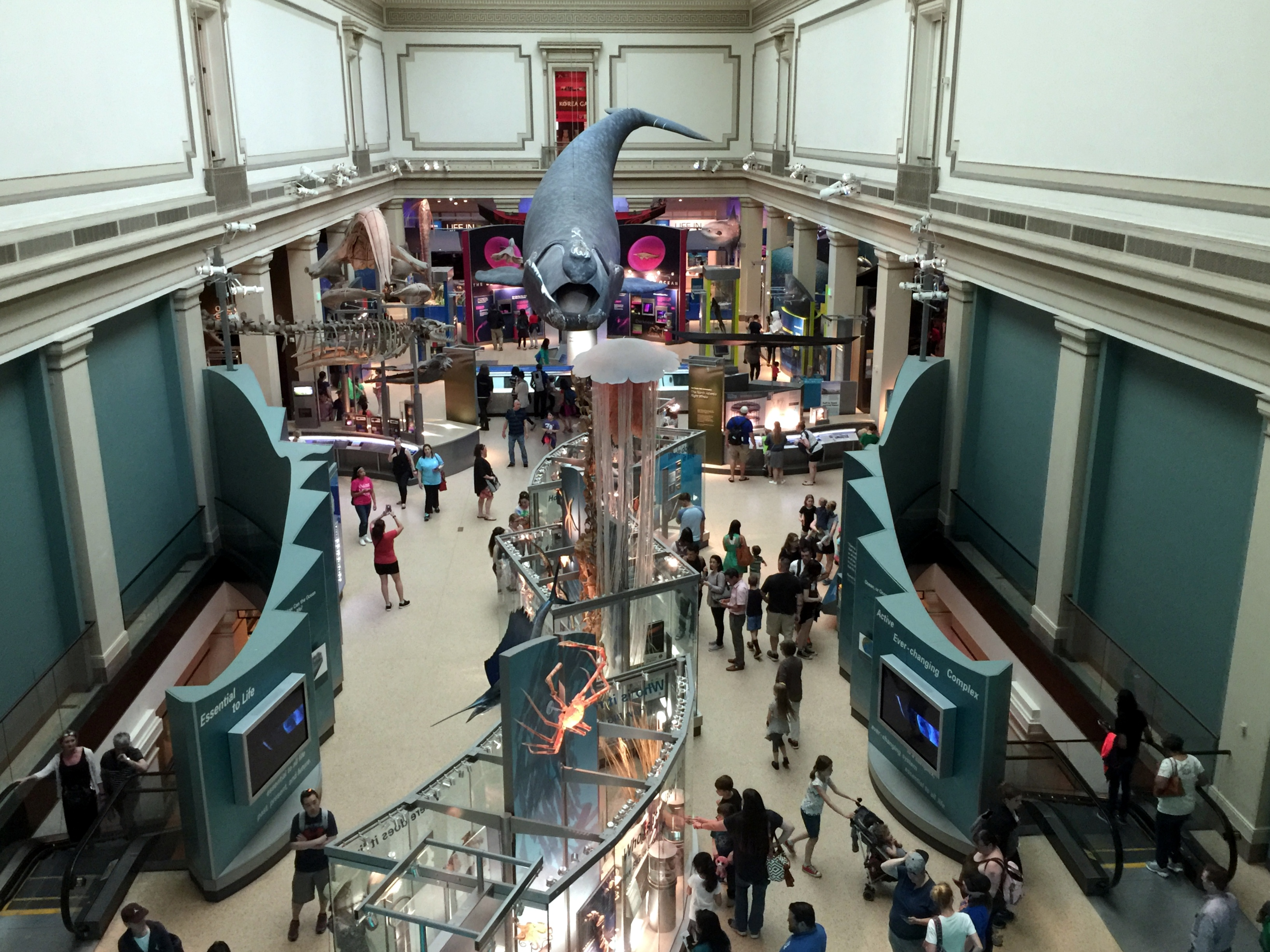
Ocean Hall

The Sant Ocean Hall opened on September 27, 2008, and is the largest renovation of the museum since it opened in 1910. The hall includes 674 marine specimens and models drawn from the over 80 million specimens in the museum's total collection, the largest in the world. The hall is named for the Roger Sant family, who donated $15 million to endow the new hall and other related programs.

The collection includes: a North Atlantic right whale, a giant Lion's mane jellyfish model, a 1,500-US-gallon (5,700 L) aquarium containing live marine fish and corals, one female giant squid displayed in the center of the hall and a male displayed off to the side, an adult coelenterate, and a Basilosaurus.

The museum also provides the Smithsonian Ocean Portal, a complementary web site that provides regularly updated, original content from the museum's research, collections, and Sant Ocean Hall as well as content provided by more than 20 collaborating organizations, including Archive, Census of Marine Life, Consortium for Ocean Leadership, Encyclopedia of Life, INDUCT, Monterey Bay Aquarium, Monterey Bay Aquarium Research Institute, National Geographic, NOAA, New England Aquarium, Ocean Conservancy, Oceania, Pew Charitable Trusts, Sea Web, Save Our Seas, Scrips Institution of Oceanography, Woods Hole Oceanographic Institution, World Heritage Marine Programmer.

=== African Voices ===
This exhibit and associated website "examines the diversity, dynamism, and global influence of Africa's peoples and cultures over time in the realms of family, work, community, and the natural environment."

=== Butterflies + Plants: Partners In Evolution ===
The Butterflies + Plants is a live butterfly pavilion which allows "visitors to observe the many ways in which butterflies and other animals have evolved, adapted, and diversified together with their plant partners over tens of millions of years." The exhibit was designed by Reich + Petch.

=== Bone Hall ===
This exhibit displays a "variety of vertebrate skeletons grouped by their evolutionary relationships."

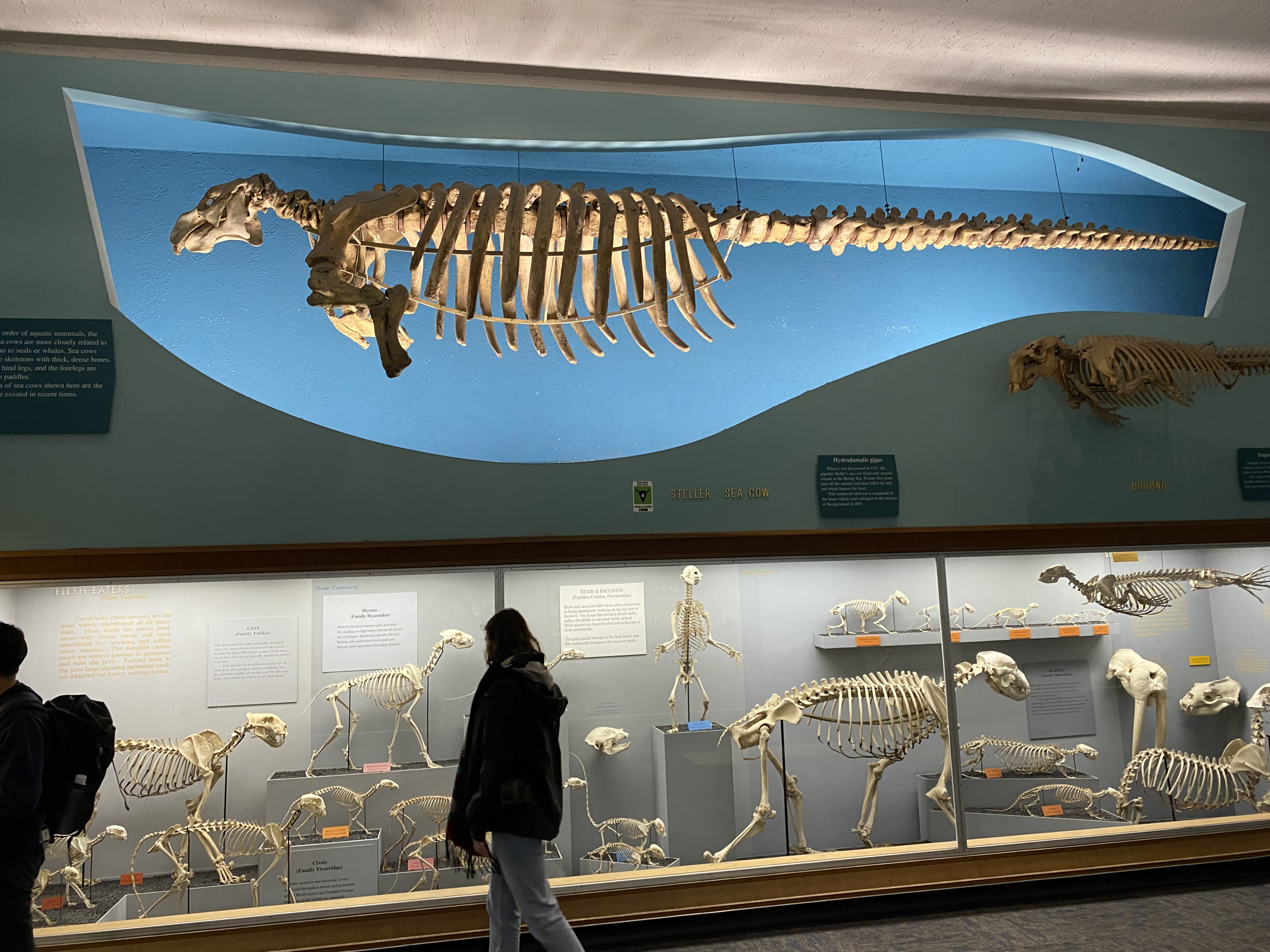
Specimen of the extinct Steller's sea cow and other assorted skeletons in the Bone Hall

=== Q?rius ===
Opened since 2013, this exhibit is the museum's interactive and educational area. Using microscopes and touch screens, the area hosts various interactive activities and contains a "collection zone" that houses over 6000 different specimens and artifacts visitors are able personally handle. The area also hosts various events such as allowing visitors to meet and discuss with Smithsonian scientists and hosting school groups.

=== Former exhibits ===
==== Western Cultures Hall ====
"This hall explores some examples from various cultures in the western world including northern Iraq, ancient Egypt, Greece and Rome and the recent discovery of the Iceman, a Copper Age mummy found in an Italian glacier." This exhibit was closed on September 26, 2010.

==== Korea Gallery ====
The Korea Gallery was a special showcase to celebrate Korean traditions and examine its unique influence and complex role in the world today.

The exhibit expressed the continuity of the past by highlighting enduring features of Korean culture over 2,600 years. The exhibit used the Smithsonian ceramics collection as well as a rich selection of photographs, ritual objects and traditional Korean carpentry to communicate and connect to both the local Korean community and an international audience. Traditional art forms, such as ceramics and calligraphy, along with mythological figures, language, large feature photographs and illustrations spoke to a range of shared historical memories which connected Koreans at home and abroad.

Personal stories of modern Koreans, as told in their own voices, provide a context to discuss some of the many issues that face the divided country today. Korea's incredible transformation from 'The Hermit Kingdom' to a world power is traced through its impact on the arts, the economy and popular culture. The exhibit was designed by Reich + Petch. This exhibit closed in 2017.

==== Reptiles ====
Reptiles on view include a preserved King cobra, Reticulated python, and boa constrictors from the Malayan and Amazonian jungles; sea turtles; crocodiles; and lizards." This exhibit closed in 2011.

== Facility ==
In the lower level, there is a bird exhibit, Urban Bird Habitat Garden, with all the migratory and native birds to Washington, D.C.

The Global Volcanism Program is housed in the department of Mineral Sciences.

The museum frequently hosts sleepovers through the Smithsonian Associates for children ages 8–12.

=== Baird Auditorium ===
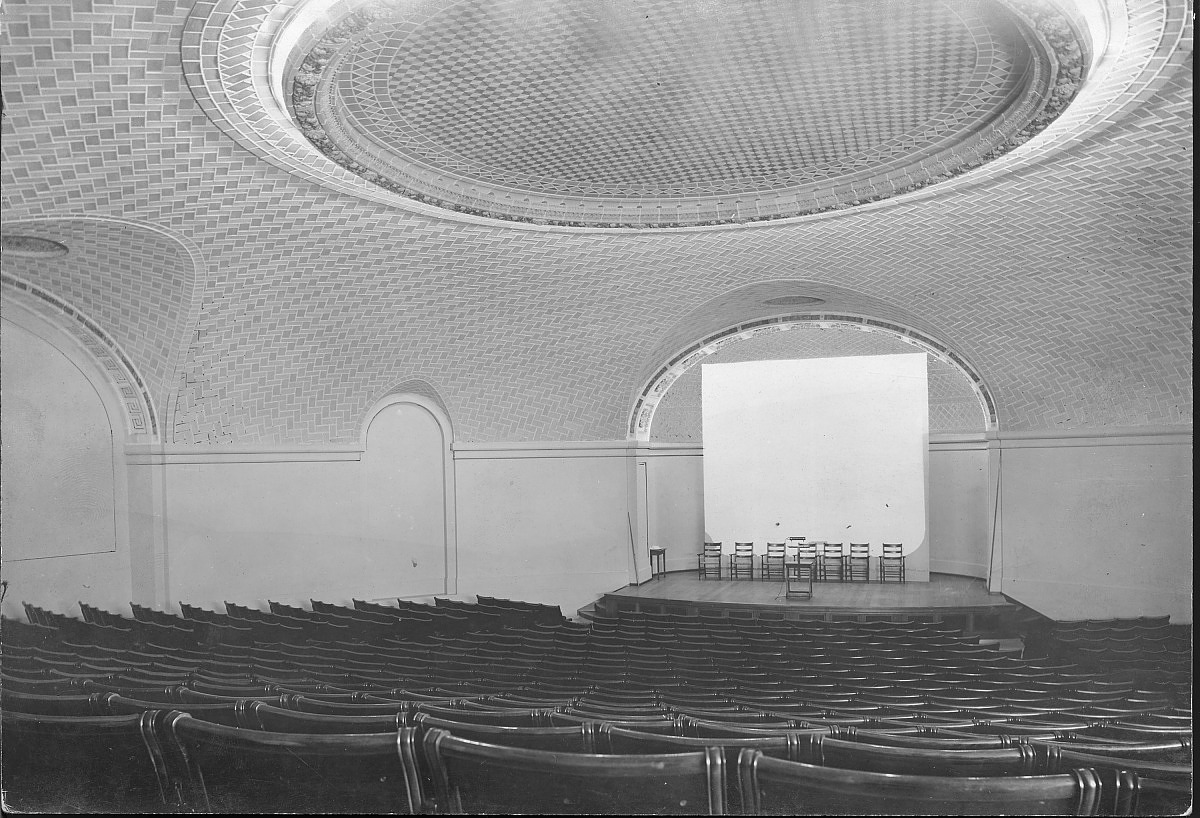
Baird Auditorium, circa 1911. Smithsonian Institution Archives Record Unit 95, Box 33, Folder: 27; Record Unit 79, Box 9, Folder: 1

Beneath the building's rotunda is the Baird Auditorium, named for the second Secretary of the Smithsonian Spencer Fullerton Baird. The Baird Auditorium was completed in 1909, designed and built by the R. Guastavino Company under the direction of Rafael Guastavino, Jr. using Catalan vault tile ceiling. The American Institute of Architects calls the Baird Auditorium the museum's "greatest interior space." According to architectural scholar Dr. John Ochsendorf, the Baird Auditorium's "daring geometry" in tile construction by the Guastavino company "spans 90 feet (27 meters) with a remarkable shallow dome in acoustical tile, and could only have been built by a company with decades of experience in tile vaulting."

==== Baird Auditorium Events ====
The Baird Auditorium has a long history of performances and events. The Baird was the location of the astronomical 'Great Debate,' also called the 'Shapley–Curtis Debate,' on April 26, 1920 on the topics of spiral nebulae and the size of the universe. Merle Travis gave a country guitar music concert in the Baird Auditorium on October 23, 1976. In early February 1977, Muddy Waters performed in the Baird as part of the Smithsonian Institution's blues series presented by the Division of Performing Arts.

== Gallery ==
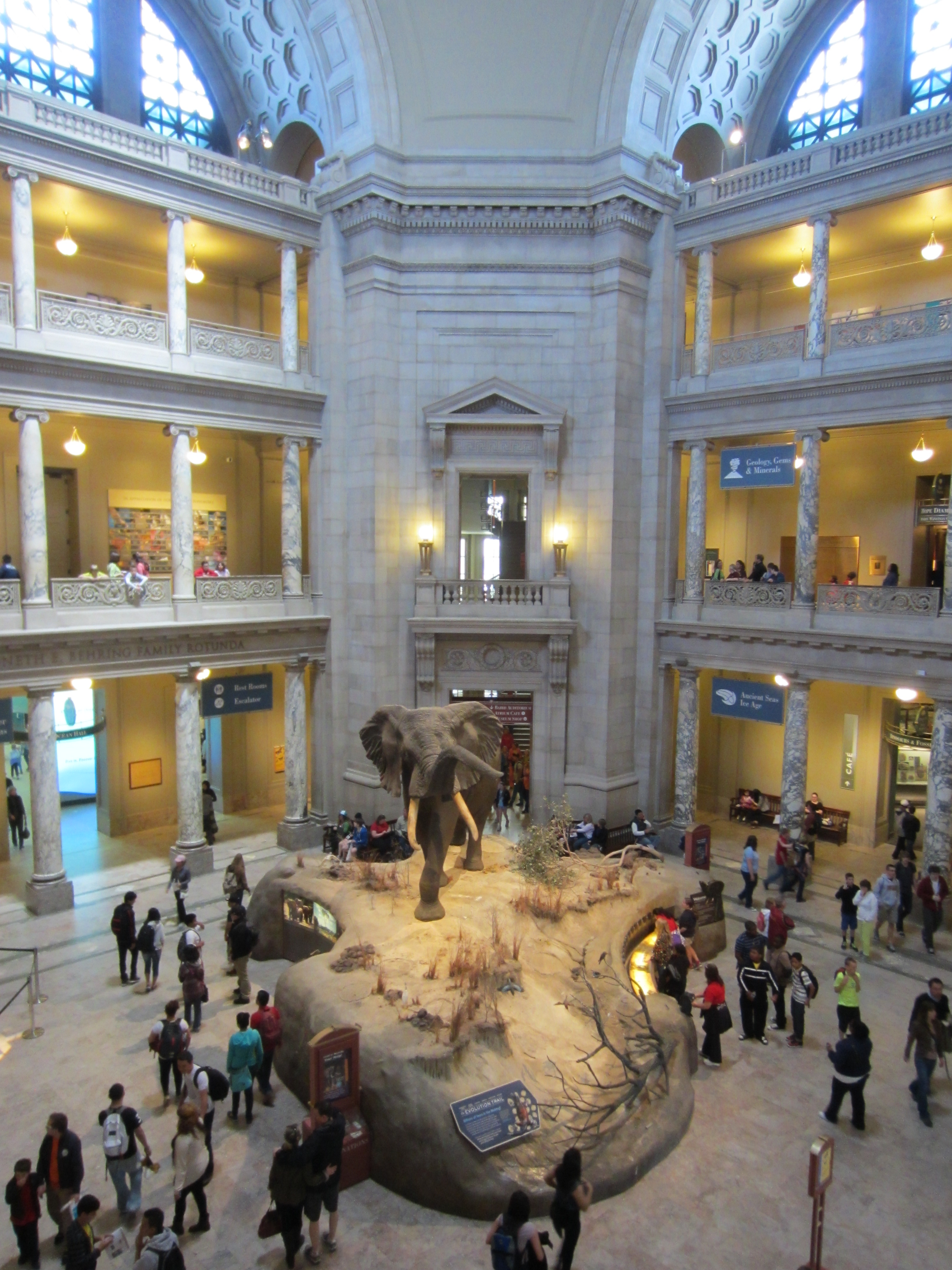
Rotunda during the day

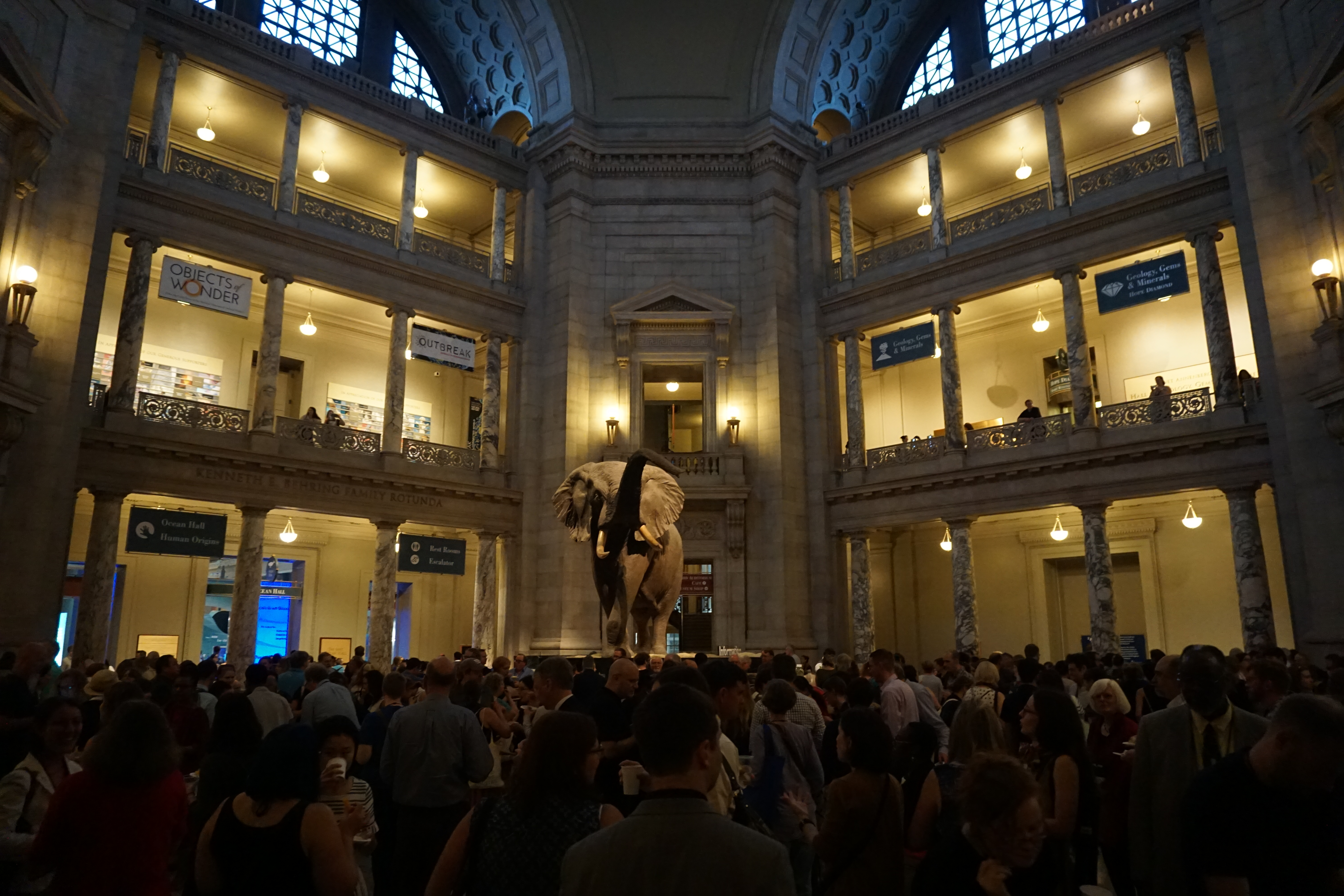
Rotunda at night

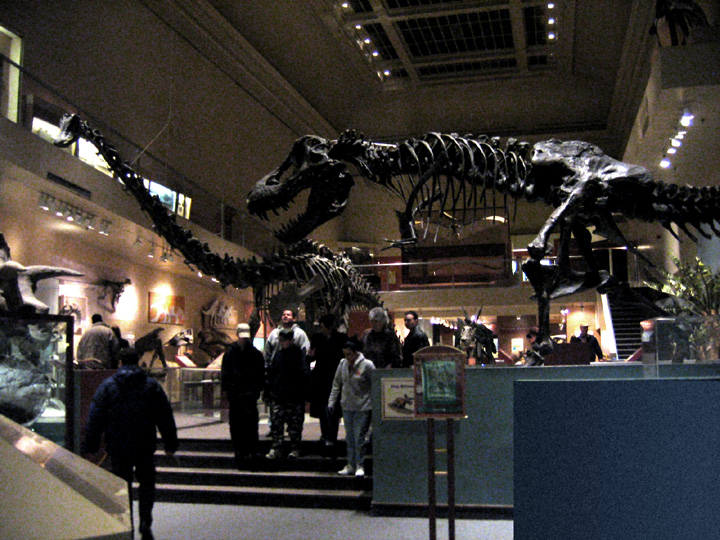
Old Hall of Dinosaurs

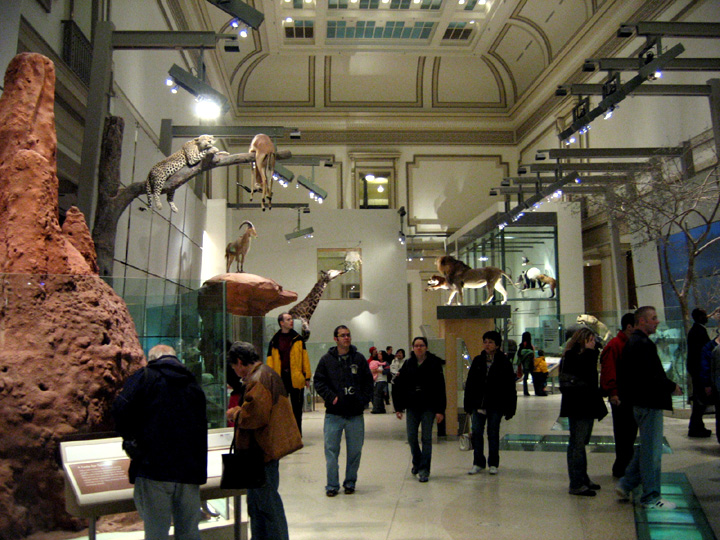
Hall of Mammals

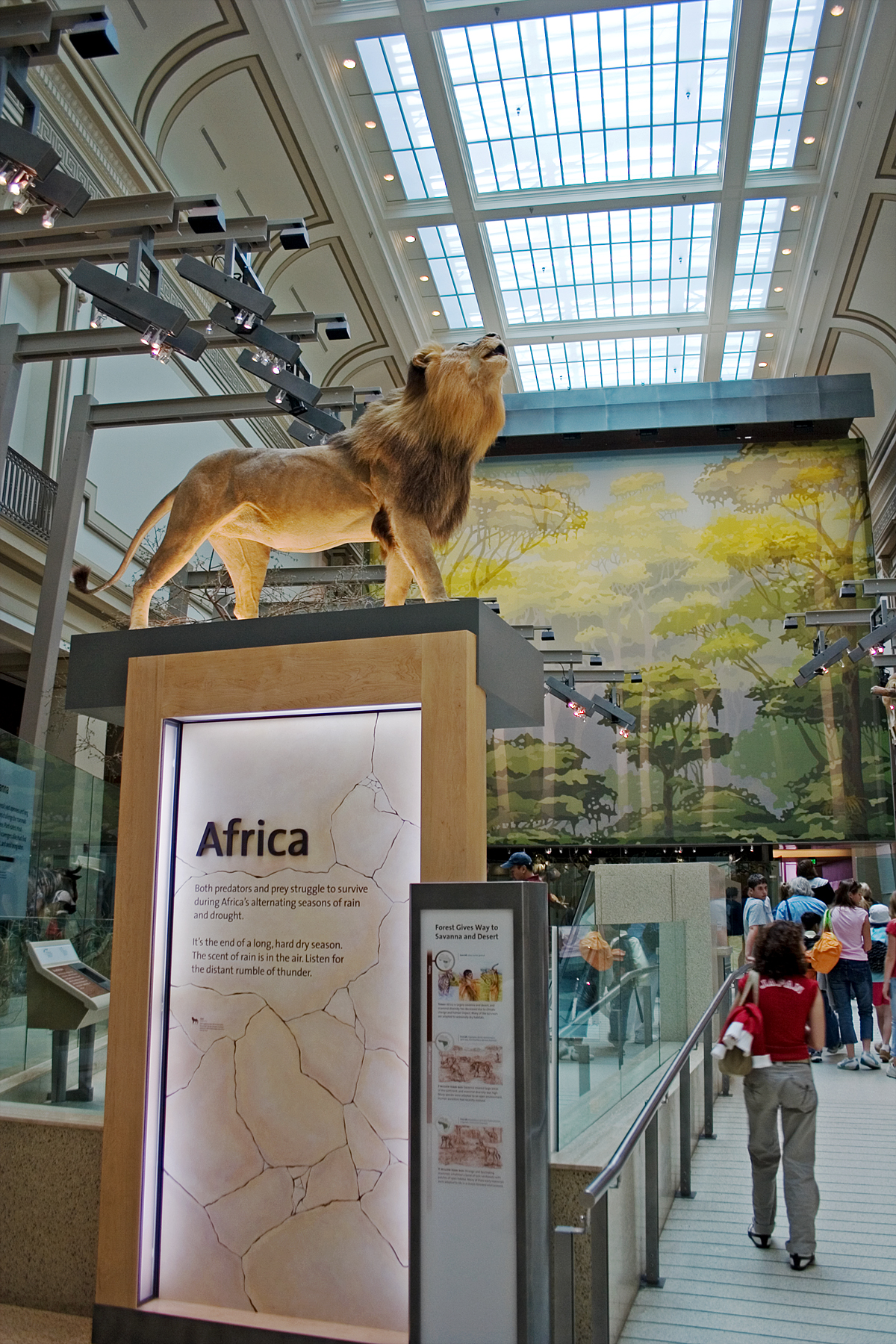
Hall of Mammals

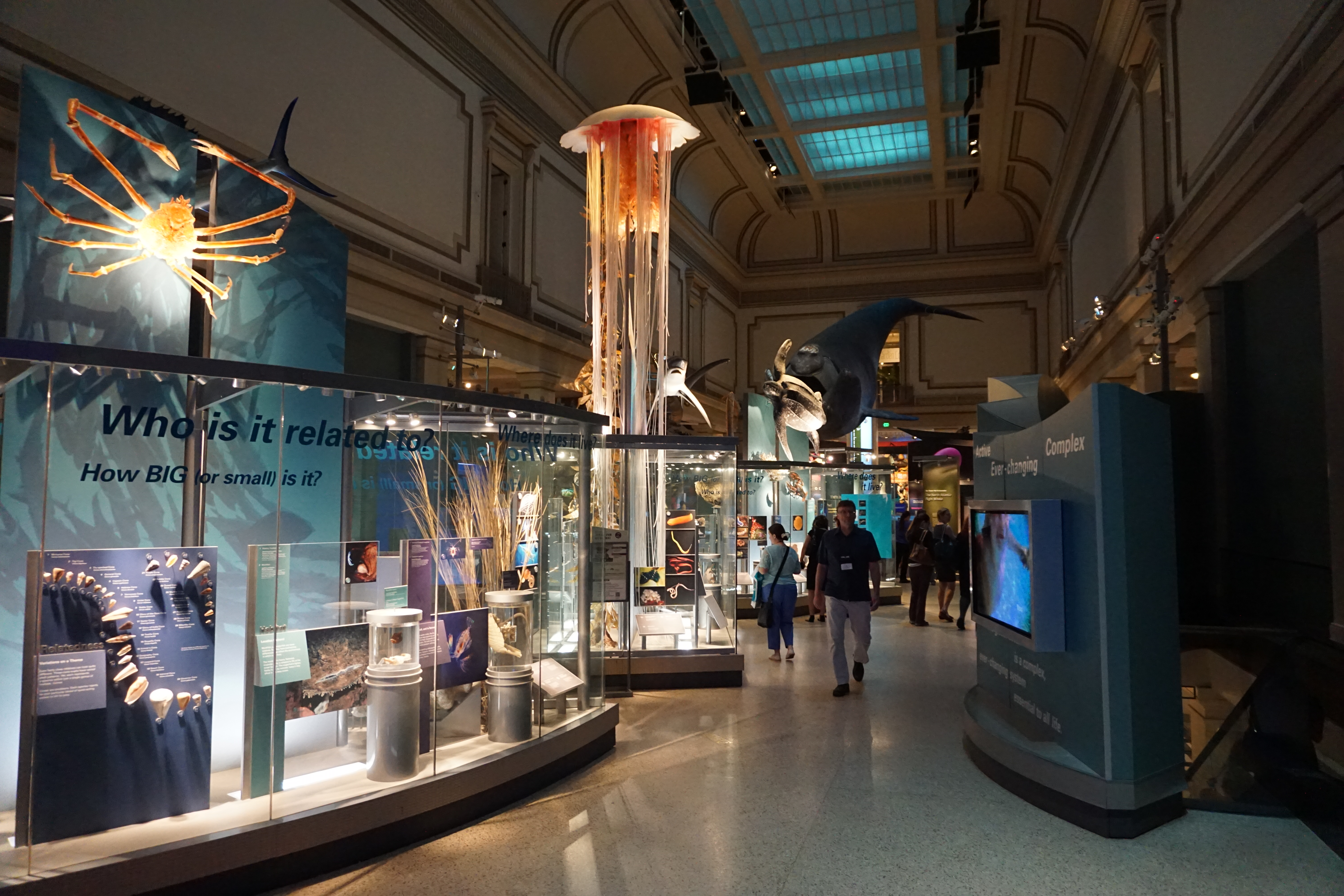
Hall of Ocean Life

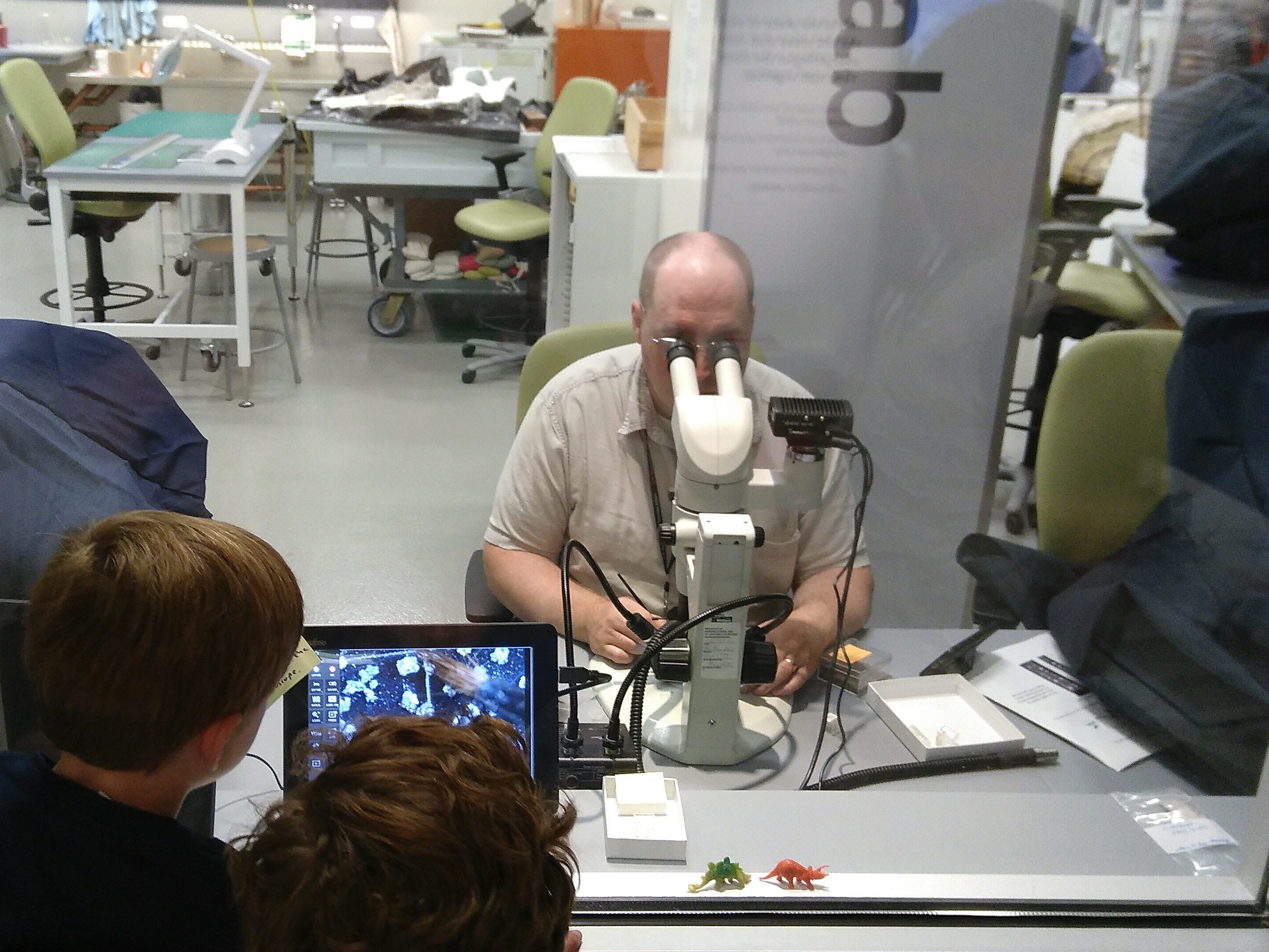
Fossil preparation in the FossiLab

== See also ==
- John Varden
- List of most-visited museums in the United States

== Bibliography ==
- D'Angelis, Gina. It Happened in Washington, D.C. Guilford, Conn.: TwoDot, 2004.
- Evelyn, Douglas E.; Dickson, Paul; and Ackerman, S.J. On This Spot: Pinpointing the Past in Washington, D.C. Sterling, Va.: Capital Books, 2008.
- Redman, Samuel J. Bone Rooms: From Scientific Racism to Human Prehistory in Museums. Cambridge: Harvard University Press. 2016.
- Yochelson, Ellis L. 1985. The National Museum of Natural History : 75 Years in the New National Museum. Washington: Smithsonian Institution Press; available at the Internet Archive.
