= Janet Sheen =

American actress (born 1944)

- Born: Janet Elizabeth Templeton; July 8, 1944 (age 82)
- Occupation: Actress
- Years active: 1965–present
- Spouse: Martin Sheen (m. 1961)
- Children: Emilio Estevez; Ramon Estevez; Charlie Sheen; Renée Estevez
- Relatives: Joe Estevez (brother-in-law)
- Family: Estevez (by marriage)

Janet Elizabeth Templeton (born July 8, 1944), known professionally as Janet Sheen, is an American actress.

== Career ==
In 1983, she played the role of Elaine de Kooning in the miniseries Kennedy. She also appeared in the film Rated X as a nurse, though she was not mentioned in the final credits.

In 1989, she was associate producer of the film Beverly Hills Brats. In 2010, she was executive producer of The Way.

== Personal life ==
As a college student at The New School for Social Research in New York City, she met her future husband, Martin Sheen. They married in December 1961, and have four children (three sons and one daughter): Emilio Estevez, Renée Estevez, Ramon Estevez, and Charlie Sheen. All four are actors.

== Filmography ==
=== Acting ===
Year	Title	Role	Notes
1983	Kennedy	Elaine de Kooning	Miniseries
2000	Rated X	Nurse (uncredited)	Made-for-TV movie directed by Emilio Estevez
2010	E! True Hollywood Story	Self	Episode: "Charlie Sheen"; Archival footage
2025	Aka Charlie Sheen	Self	Episode: "Part One"; Archival footage

=== Producer ===
Year	Title	Director(s)	Notes
1989	Beverly Hills Brats	Jim Sotos	Comedy film
2010	The Way	Emilio Estevez	Comedy drama film
