= Ramon Estevez =

American actor & director (born 1963)

Ramón Estévez
- Born: Ramón Luis Estévez; August 7, 1963 (age 63); New York City, U.S.
- Other name: Ramón Sheen
- Occupations: Actor; theatre director
- Years active: 1982–2003 • 2007–present
- Partner: David Woodbury
- Parents: Martin Sheen; Janet Templeton
- Relatives: Emilio Estevez (brother); Charlie Sheen (brother); Renée Estevez (sister); Joe Estevez (uncle)
- Family: Estevez family

Ramón Luis Estévez (born August 7, 1963), sometimes billed as Ramón Sheen, is an American actor and director who runs Estevez Sheen Productions.

== Early life ==
Estevez is the second of four children born to actor Martin Sheen and artist Janet Templeton. His siblings are actors Emilio Estevez, Charlie Sheen, and Renée Estevez. His father is of Spanish and Irish descent.

== Career ==
=== Acting career ===
Estevez's movies include That Was Then... This Is Now (1985) and Cadence (1990). In Cadence, he played a sycophantic "spineless corporal" to the stockade's commanding officer. Estevez was disguised in Cadence as a funny guard who wore glasses and "his hat most of the time" to prevent being recognized as Charlie Sheen's brother.

In 1992, Estevez appeared in The Last P.O.W.? The Bobby Garwood Story.

He appeared in Diamond Rio's 1996 video "It's All in Your Head", and has written songs for Diamond Rio. Estevez's plays include a 1982 Burt Reynolds Dinner Theatre performance in One Flew Over the Cuckoo's Nest.

=== Directing and producing career ===
Estevez is involved in production development of Warner Bros.-affiliated company, Estevez Sheen Productions, a combination of his father's real and stage surnames. The production company is located in Los Angeles, California.

In 2010, Estevez approached Michael Ritchie about staging the play The Subject Was Roses at the Mark Taper Forum on behalf of Estevez Sheen Productions. Martin Sheen created the play's Timmy on Broadway in 1964 and wanted to revisit it as Timmy's dad, John. In collaboration with Ritchie and Sheen, Estevez arranged for Brian Geraghty to play a role with Neil Pepe as the director. The play opened on February 21, 2010 with Estevez in attendance. A 2011 Estevez Sheen Productions project was The Way with James Nesbitt written and directed by Emilio Estevez and starring Martin Sheen.

From 2012 to 2014, Estevez co-produced Anger Management with his brother Charlie Sheen.

== Filmography ==
Film

- The Dead Zone (1983)
- That Was Then... This Is Now (1985)
- A State of Emergency (1986)
- Turnaround (1987)
- Fall of the Eagles (1989)
- Beverly Hills Brats (1989)
- Esmeralda Bay (1989)
- A Man of Passion (1989)
- Cadence (1990)
- Alligator II: The Mutation (1991)
- Sandman (1993)
- The Expert (1995)
- Shadow Conspiracy (1997)

Television

- In the Custody of Strangers (1982)
- The Fourth Wise Man (1985)
- Jesse Hawkes (1 episode, 1989)
- Zorro (2 episodes, 1990–1991)
- Revealed with Jules Asner (1 episode, 2002)
- The West Wing (1 episode, 2003)
- The Dame Edna Treatment (1 episode, 2007)
- Anger Management (Co-Producer with Charlie Sheen, 2012)
