= Estevez family =

American acting family

- Country: United States
- Current region: Ohio; Malibu, California; New York City
- Etymology: Galician son of Stephen and Estevo
- Origin: Salceda de Caselas, Galicia, Spain
- Founded: 1920s (Francisco Estévez Martínez and Mary-Ann Phelan, Ohio)

The Estévez family (also known by the stage surname Sheen) is an American acting family of Spanish and Irish descent.

== Family tree ==
Members include:

Estévez family tree

Francisco Estévez Martínez (1898–1974)	Mary-Ann Estévez (b. Mary-Ann Phelan 1903–1951)
Janet Sheen (b. Janet Templeton 1944)	Martin Sheen (b. Ramón Antonio Gerardo Estévez, 1940)	Joe Estevez (b. 1946)
Paula Abdul (b. 1962)	Emilio Estevez (b. 1962)	Ramon Estevez (b. 1963)	Brooke Mueller (b. 1977)	Charlie Sheen (b. Carlos Irwin Estévez, 1965)	Denise Richards (b. 1971)	Renée Estevez (b. 1967)

== See also ==
- Estevez
- List of entertainment industry dynasties
