= Matt Clark (actor) =

American actor (1936–2026)

- Born: November 25, 1936; Washington, D.C., U.S.
- Died: March 15, 2026 (aged 89); Austin, Texas, U.S.
- Occupation: Actor
- Years active: 1958–2014
- Spouses: Erica Lann (m. 1958; div. 1966) Carol Trieste (m. 1968; div. 1988) Sharon Mays (m. 2000)
- Children: 5
- Relatives: Kimberly Beck (daughter-in-law)

Matt Clark (November 25, 1936 – March 15, 2026) was an American actor. He was best known for his roles in Western films.

== Early life ==
Clark was born in Washington, D.C., on November 25, 1936, the son of Theresa (née Castello), a teacher, and Frederick William Clark, a carpenter. After serving in the U.S. Army, he attended George Washington University before dropping out.

== Career ==
After working at various jobs, he joined a local D.C. theatre group. He later became a member of New York's Living Theatre company and worked off-Broadway and in community theatre in the late 1950s.

Clark directed the 1988 film Da, as well as one episode from the television series CBS Schoolbreak Special and two episodes from the television series Midnight Caller. He also wrote the story for the 1970 film Homer.

== Death ==
Clark died from complications of spinal surgery at his home in Austin, Texas, on March 15, 2026, at the age of 89.

== Filmography ==
=== Film ===
Year	Title	Role	Notes
1964	Black Like Me	Mugger in Alley	
1967	In the Heat of the Night	Packy Harrison	
1967	Will Penny	Romulus Quint	
1969	The Bridge at Remagen	Corporal Jellicoe	
1970	Macho Callahan	Jailer	
1970	Monte Walsh	Rufus Brady	
1971	The Beguiled	Scrogins	
1971	The Grissom Gang	Joe Bailey	
1972	The Cowboys	Smiley	
1972	Pocket Money	American Prisoner	
1972	The Culpepper Cattle Co.	Pete	
1972	The Great Northfield, Minnesota Raid	Bob Younger	
1972	Jeremiah Johnson	Qualen	
1972	The Life and Times of Judge Roy Bean	Nick the Grub	
1973	Pat Garrett and Billy the Kid	J.W. Bell	
1973	Emperor of the North Pole	Yardlet	
1973	White Lightning	Dude Watson	
1973	The Laughing Policeman	Coroner	
1974	The Terminal Man	Gerhard	
1975	Hearts of the West	Jackson	
1976	The Outlaw Josey Wales	Kelly	
1977	Vengeance	Grover	
1977	Outlaw Blues	Billy Bob	
1978	The Driver	Red Plainclothesman	
1979	Shadow of Fear	Ike	
1979	Dreamer	Spider	
1980	Brubaker	Roy Purcell	
1980	Ruckus	Cece	
1981	The Legend of the Lone Ranger	Sheriff Wiatt	
1981	An Eye for an Eye	Tom McCoy	
1982	Some Kind of Hero	Mickey	
1982	Honkytonk Man	Virgil	
1983	Love Letters	Chuck	
1984	The Adventures of Buckaroo Banzai Across the 8th Dimension	Secretary of Defense John McKinley	
1984	Country	Tom McMullen	
1985	Tuff Turf	Stuart Hiller	
1985	Return to Oz	Uncle Henry	
1986	Let's Get Harry	Walt Clayton	
1989	The Horror Show	Dr. Tower	AKA House III: The Horror Show
1990	Back to the Future Part III	Chester the Bartender	
1990	Cadence	Bean Sr.	
1991	Class Action	Judge Symes	
1991	A Seduction in Travis County	Dobbs	
1992	Frozen Assets	J. F. Hughes	
1993	The Harvest	Hank	
1995	Candyman: Farewell to the Flesh	Honore Thibideaux	
1995	Mother	Ben Wilson	
1997	Hacks	Bus Driver	
1998	Homegrown	Sheriff Stanley Kroopf	
1998	Claudine's Return	Pauline	
1999	Five Aces	Phillip	
1999	A Stranger in the Kingdom	Judge Forest Allen	
2000	South of Heaven, West of Hell	Burl Dunfries	
2004	Killer Diller	Barge Captain	
2007	Rocking the Boat: A Musical Conversation and Journey	Self	Documentary
2010	The Way	Father Frank	
2013	42	Luther	
2014	A Million Ways to Die in the West	Old Prospector	Final film role

=== Television ===
Year	Title	Role	Notes
1966	Ben Casey	Patient	Episode: "Where Did All the Roses Go?"
1966	Bob Hope Presents the Chrysler Theatre	Paco Perez	Episode: "One Embezzlement and Two Margaritas"
1967	T.H.E. Cat	Killer	Episode: "The Blood-Red Night"
1967	Dundee and the Culhane	Smith	2 episodes
1967	The Rat Patrol	Corporal Meekin	Episode: "The Kingdom Come Raid"
1967	Death Valley Days	Montana Joe	Episode: "Lost Sheep in Trinidad"
1969	N.Y.P.D.	Eddie Anders	Episode: "Face on the Dart Board"
1969	Bonanza	Fantan	Episode: "The Witness"
1969, 1970	The Name of the Game	Harris / Frankie	2 episodes
1973	The Waltons	Mr. Hennessey	Episode: "The Fawn"
1973	Kung Fu	Niebo	Episode: "The Elixir"
1974	The Rookies	Joey Hughes	Episode: "The Late Mr. Brent"
1974	The Execution of Private Slovik	Dunn	Television film
1974	Melvin Purvis: G-Man	Charles Parlmetter	Television film
1974	The Great Ice Rip-Off	Georgie	Television film
1974	This Is the West That Was	Buffalo Bill Cody	Television film
1975	The Kansas City Massacre	Vernon Miller	Television film
1975–1979	Little House on the Prairie	Seth Berwick / Eric Boulton	3 episodes
1977	Dog and Cat	Lieutenant Arthur Kipling	6 episodes
1978	Lacy and the Mississippi Queen	Reynolds	Television film
1978	Lucan	Jake Jones	Episode: "Thunder God Gold"
1979	The Last Ride of the Dalton Gang	George Newcomb	Television film
1981	The Children Nobody Wanted	Bill Westbrook	Television film
1981, 1982	Dynasty	Frank Dean	2 episodes
1982	In the Custody of Strangers	Mike Raines	Television film
1983	Highway Honeys	Wolfe Crawley	Television film
1983	The Winds of War	Hansen	Episode: "Into the Maelstrom"
1983	ABC Afterschool Special	Phil Cranston	Episode: "Andrea's Story: A Hitchhiking Tragedy"
1985	Magnum, P.I.	Jack Damon	Episode: "A Pretty Good Dancing Chicken"
1985	Love, Mary	Fennie Groda	Television film
1985	Out of the Darkness	John Hubbard	Television film
1985	Hardcastle and McCormick	Sheriff Dale Cutler	Episode: "The Career Breaker"
1987	The Quick and the Dead	Doc Shabitt	Television film
1987	CBS Summer Playhouse	Matt	Episode: "Travelin' Man"
1987	The Gambler, Part III: The Legend Continues	Sergeant Grinder	Television film
1988	War and Remembrance	Chief Clark (Northampton)	Episode: "Part V"
1988	CBS Schoolbreak Special	Pawnshop Clerk	Episode: "Gambler"
1989	Terror on Highway 91	Jim Warren	Television film
1989	Midnight Caller	Pete Holden	Episode: "Bank Job"
1989	Blind Witness	Lieutenant Schapper	Television film
1993	Dead Before Dawn	John DeSilva	Television film
1993	Barbarians at the Gate	Edward A. Horrigan Jr.	Television film
1993–1995	Grace Under Fire	Emmet Kelly	4 episodes
1994	Lois & Clark: The New Adventures of Superman	Homeless Man	Episode: "All Shook Up"
1995	A Season of Hope	Wallace Porter	Television film
1995	Screen Two	Doug Kinross	Episode: "Crazy for a Kiss"
1995	She Stood Alone: The Tailhook Scandal	Paula Coughlin	Television film
1995	Lonesome Dove: The Series	Reverend Bantry	Episode: "The Bride"
1995–1996	The Jeff Foxworthy Show	Walt Bacon	12 episodes
1996	Raven Hawk	Ed Hudson	Television film
1996	Trilogy of Terror II	Roger Ansford	Television film
1996, 2001	Walker, Texas Ranger	Cooper's Friend / Hank Cotton	3 episodes
1997	The Visitor	Monroe	Episode: "The Devil's Rainbow"
1997	Touched by an Angel	Markus Cavanaugh	Episode: "Venice"
1998	The Pretender	Lyle Bowman	Episode: "Crash"
1998	The Practice	Jesse Manning	Episode: "Body Count"
2000	Chicago Hope	Clarence Gates	Episode: "Everybody's Special at Chicago Hope"
