= The War at Home (1996 film) =

1996 film by Emilio Estevez

- Theatrical release poster
- Directed by: Emilio Estevez
- Written by: James Duff
- Based on: Homefront by James Duff
- Produced by: Emilio Estevez; Brad Krevoy; Steven Stabler; James Duff
- Starring: Kathy Bates; Martin Sheen; Kimberly Williams; Emilio Estevez; Carla Gugino; Lane Smith
- Cinematography: Peter Levy
- Edited by: Craig Bassett
- Music by: Basil Poledouris
- Production companies: Touchstone Pictures; Motion Picture Corporation of America
- Distributed by: Buena Vista Pictures Distribution
- Release date: November 20, 1996
- Running time: 123 minutes
- Country: United States
- Language: English
- Budget: $3 million
- Box office: $44,722

The War at Home is a 1996 American drama war film directed by and starring, and co-produced by Emilio Estevez. The film also stars Kathy Bates and Martin Sheen. Writer James Duff adapted his 1984 play Homefront.

== Plot ==
Jeremy Collier is a returning Vietnam War hero whose experiences leave him unable to adjust to the quiet realities of small-town life. Bob Collier, Jeremy's father, expects his son to go back to his life as it was, without understanding the problems of PTSD. Jeremy's mother, Maurine, treats him "like he's a 10-year-old," and seems to think he should forget about his war experiences. His sister Karen is more understanding of his readjustment problems, but their father doesn't want her to help her brother.

When the family's Thanksgiving celebration occurs Jeremy refuses to put on his "nice" clothes and instead decides to wear his combat uniform and medal. At the conclusion of the Thanksgiving celebration, Jeremy pulls his handgun on his father and his family, explaining the hate he feels for his father because he would not lend Jeremy money to leave the country to escape the draft.

== Cast ==
- Kathy Bates as Maurine Collier
- Martin Sheen as Bob Collier
- Kimberly Williams as Karen Collier
- Emilio Estevez as Jeremy Collier
- Carla Gugino as Melissa
- Geoffrey Blake as David
- Penny Allen as Majoree
- Corin Nemec as Donald
- Renee Estevez as Brenda
- Chad Morgan as Bus Station Clerk
- Lane Smith as Majoree's Husband

== Production ==
The film was made for $3 million, following a deal Estevez cut with Disney (who would later under-promote the film) to appear in D3: The Mighty Ducks, and was distributed by Touchstone Pictures. The soundtrack is faithful to the time period, using music from artists such as Buffalo Springfield, and Crosby, Stills, Nash, and Young. Singer Jena Kraus is featured singing a folk version of the song "Me and Bobby McGee".

== Release ==
The film was released in theatres on November 20, 1996. It was a box office failure, grossing only $43,000.

== Home media ==
The film was released on DVD in the US in September 2002.

== Reception ==
The film received mixed reviews. Rotten Tomatoes reports a 60% approval rating based on 15 reviews, with an average score of 5.83/10.

Lisa Schwarzbaum of Entertainment Weekly gave the film a B− and said, "The Vietnam-flashback material doesn’t resonate as sharply as it did when screenwriter James Duff first presented this as a stage play in 1984. But with Sheen doing a nice turn as a bewildered Dad and Kathy Bates such a nerve-rattling force as the kill-em-with-cleanliness mother, the agonized family dynamics are effectively awful." Stephen Holden of The New York Times remarked how familiar the premise was, but that the film "still finds moments of wrenching sadness in its microscopic examination of an all-American family torn apart by the Vietnam War," and praised the performances and themes.
