= James W. Skotchdopole =

American film producer and assistant director

James W. Skotchdopole is an American film producer. He has produced films such as Birdman and The Revenant.

== Career ==
Raised in New York, Skotchdopole career in the film industry began in 1982. In 1984, Skotchdopole became the youngest member to be accepted into the Directors Guild of America. Skotchdopole served as an Executive producer on four of Director Tony Scott's films, and collaborated with Nora Ephron three times. He also worked as an Executive producer with Quentin Tarantino twice, on Death Proof and Django Unchained. As a producer on Alejandro González Iñárritu's Birdman, Skotchdopole won an Academy Award for Best Picture at the 87th Academy Awards. Iñárritu and Skotchdopole collaborated again in 2015 with The Revenant.

== Filmography ==
He was a producer in all films unless otherwise noted.

=== Film ===
Year	Film	Credit	Notes
1990	Naked Tango	Associate producer	
1993	Sleepless in Seattle	Associate producer	
1993	True Romance	Co-producer	
1994	Mixed Nuts	Executive producer	
1995	Crimson Tide	Associate producer	
1996	The Fan	Executive producer	
1998	Enemy of the State	Executive producer	
2000	Company Man		
2000	Sand		
2001	Spy Game	Executive producer	
2004	Man on Fire	Executive producer	
2005	Bewitched	Executive producer	
2007	Grindhouse	Line producer	
2007	Death Proof	Line producer	
2008	The Women	Executive producer	
2008	Surfer, Dude	Executive producer	
2010	My Own Love Song	Executive producer	
2011	Violet & Daisy	Executive producer	
2012	Lay the Favorite	Executive producer	
2012	Upside Down	Executive producer	
2012	Django Unchained	Executive producer	
2014	Birdman		Won Academy Award for Best Picture.
2015	Accidental Love	Executive producer	
2015	The Revenant		
2017	War Machine	Executive producer	
2018	Furlough	Executive producer	
2021	Crisis	Co-executive producer	
2025	Play Dirty	Producer	
TBA	The Joy Division		

Second unit director or assistant director

Year	Film	Role	Notes
1985	Turk 182	Second assistant director	
1985	A Chorus Line	Second assistant director	
1986	The Money Pit	Second assistant director	
1986	Brighton Beach Memoirs	Second assistant director	
1987	Mannequin	Second assistant director	
1987	Ishtar	Second assistant director	
1987	The Untouchables	Second assistant director	
1987	The Believers	Second assistant director: New York	
1988	Biloxi Blues	Second assistant director	
1988	Moon over Parador	Second assistant director	
1988	Scrooged	Second assistant director	
1989	Dead Bang	Second assistant director	
1990	Revenge	Second assistant director	
1990	Days of Thunder	First assistant director	
1991	What About Bob?	First assistant director	
1991	The Last Boy Scout	First assistant director	
1992	Housesitter	First assistant director	
1993	Sleepless in Seattle	First assistant director	
1993	True Romance	First assistant director	
1994	Mixed Nuts	First assistant director Second unit director	Uncredited
1995	Crimson Tide	First assistant director	
1996	The Fan	First assistant director	
1998	Enemy of the State	Second unit director	Uncredited
2000	Sand	Second assistant director	
2001	Spy Game	Second unit director	Uncredited
2005	Bewitched	Second unit director	Uncredited
2008	The Women	Second unit director	Uncredited

Production manager

Year	Film	Role
2001	Spy Game	Unit production manager: Morocco
2012	Lay the Favorite	Unit production manager
2012	Django Unchained	Unit production manager
2014	Birdman	Unit production manager
2015	The Revenant	Unit production manager

Miscellaneous crew

Year	Film	Role
1983	Easy Money	Production assistant
1983	Eddie and the Cruisers	Production assistant
1983	A Night in Heaven	Production assistant
1983	Slayground	Production assistant
1984	The Lonely Guy	Production assistant
1984	Firstborn	Production assistant
1984	The Cotton Club	Production assistant
2010	Just Wright	Production consultant

Thanks

Year	Film	Role
2013	The Spectacular Now	The producers wish to thank
2016	The Comedian	The producers wish to thank the following for their assistance

=== Television ===
Year	Title	Credit
2020	Mrs. America	Co-executive producer
2022	The Peripheral	Co-executive producer
2024	Fallout	Executive producer, unit production manager (season 1)

Production manager

Year	Title	Role
2020	Mrs. America	Unit production manager

Miscellaneous crew

Year	Title	Role	Notes
1984	A Doctor's Story	Production assistant	Television film
