= Sand (2000 film) =

- Directed by: Matt Palmieri
- Written by: Matt Palmieri
- Produced by: Matt Palmieri; James W. Skotchdopole
- Starring: Michael Vartan; Norman Reedus; Kari Wührer; Harry Dean Stanton; Emilio Estevez; Denis Leary; Jon Lovitz; Julie Delpy
- Cinematography: Dan Mindel; John Skotchdopole
- Edited by: Kristina Trirogoff
- Release date: 2000
- Running time: 89 minutes
- Country: United States
- Language: English

Sand is a 2000 black comedy crime thriller film, directed and written by Matt Palmieri. It stars Michael Vartan, Norman Reedus, Kari Wührer, Harry Dean Stanton, Emilio Estevez, Denis Leary, Jon Lovitz and Julie Delpy.

== Plot ==
The Briggs family comes together for the first time in over twenty years to attend the funeral and read the will of Marina. It is a very uneasy experience for Tyler, her son.

Having been abandoned by his father Gus when he was an infant, Tyler grew up only with his mother Marina and felt no real ties to Gus or his two stepbrothers Barker and Hardy, who were not only alcoholic cocaine addicts but also very ill-mannered and an embarrassment. Tyler disliked Gus' good friend and travel companion "Boston" Teddy, whose obsession with the Kennedy family of Hyannis Port, Massachusetts, as well as John F. Kennedy's sexual exploits in and out of the White House even disturbed Gus.

Marina left her son Tyler everything that she had. Tyler, in a show of good faith, only took the White 1972 Ford LTD and a photo album and left everything else, the house and $6,000, to his father Gus. Tyler then took off for the coast to where Marina was born and raised to get away from the "family" in solitude.

Striking up a friendship with Jack and his friends Max, Andy, and Trip, he befriends the local beach boys. Tyler gets to stay at the Higgins' home on the beach as a handyman. There, he meets and falls in love with Jack's sister, Sandy, who just came home for the summer from college. - Life is good for Tyler, with a sweet and loving girlfriend, a new set of friends, a job and a place to live. The situation changes when, one morning, Gus, Teddy, Baker and Hardy come to town. Drinking hard booze as well as smoking marijuana and snorting cocaine, the quartet, mostly Baker and Hardy, made life miserable not only for Tyler but everyone else in town.

The brothers find Sandy alone in the Higgins house where Tyler is living and try to rape her, only to be stopped by Gus and Teddy. When Sandy's brother, Jack, finds out that those who tried to rape his sister were Tyler's stepbrothers Baker and Hardy, he and some of his friends go to the motel where they are staying with Gus and Teddy. Finding them drunk and stoned, Jack beats them, leaving them black & blue and knocked-out cold. This leads to Baker and Hardy attacking Jack the next day, who is alone on the beach. Just when they are about to kill him, they get attacked by Jack's friend Trip with his homemade baseball bat.

Planning to get even with Jack for what happened to them on the beach, Baker and Hardy kidnap and torture Jack's friend Max. Jack and his friend Andy try to come to his rescue, only to be kidnapped themselves by the brothers and forced to walk the plank on the pier by the Pacific Ocean. Jack and Andy turn the tables on the duo by fighting them off and having all four of them fall down into the water. Baker and Hardy, being drunk and on drugs and also not knowing how to swim, drown.

The brothers' father, angry at the deaths of his sons, goes out looking for Jack. Jack turns the tables by showing up outside the father's motel room, with Sandy trying to stop him. Jack rehashes what happened to Gus' sons and Gus chases both Jack and Sandy down to the beach and shoots Jack in the leg. He is then finally tackled by Tyler, who tells Gus that killing Jack won't bring Baker and Hardy back but only destroy his life as well. Sandy and Tyler then leave to begin a more peaceful life together, Jack and Gus' fate is left unknown.

== Cast ==
- Michael Vartan as Tyler "Ty" Briggs
  - James Davies as Young Tyler "Ty" Briggs
- Norman Reedus as Jack
- Kari Wuhrer as Sandy
- Marshall Bell as Gus
- John Hawkes as Hardy
- Peter Simmons as Andy
- Rodney Eastman as Baker
- Bodhi Elfman as Max
- Denis Leary as Teddy
- Harry Dean Stanton as Leo
- Julie Delpy as Lili
- Jon Lovitz as Kirby
- Emilio Estevez as Trip
- Kayce Martin as Marina
- Carlotta Chang as Maya

== Sources ==
- Mick Martin, Marsha Porter (2004). ""Sand"". DVD & Video Guide 2005. Ballantine Books. p. 962. ISBN 9780345449955.
- Jim Craddock (2004). "Sand". Videohound's Golden Movie Retriever 2005. Gale. p. 703. ISBN 9780787674700.
- Thomson Gale (2007). "Sand". Video Sourcebook: A Guide to Programs Currently Available on Video. Gale. p. 2533. ISBN 9781414400990.
