= Cort McCown =

American actor

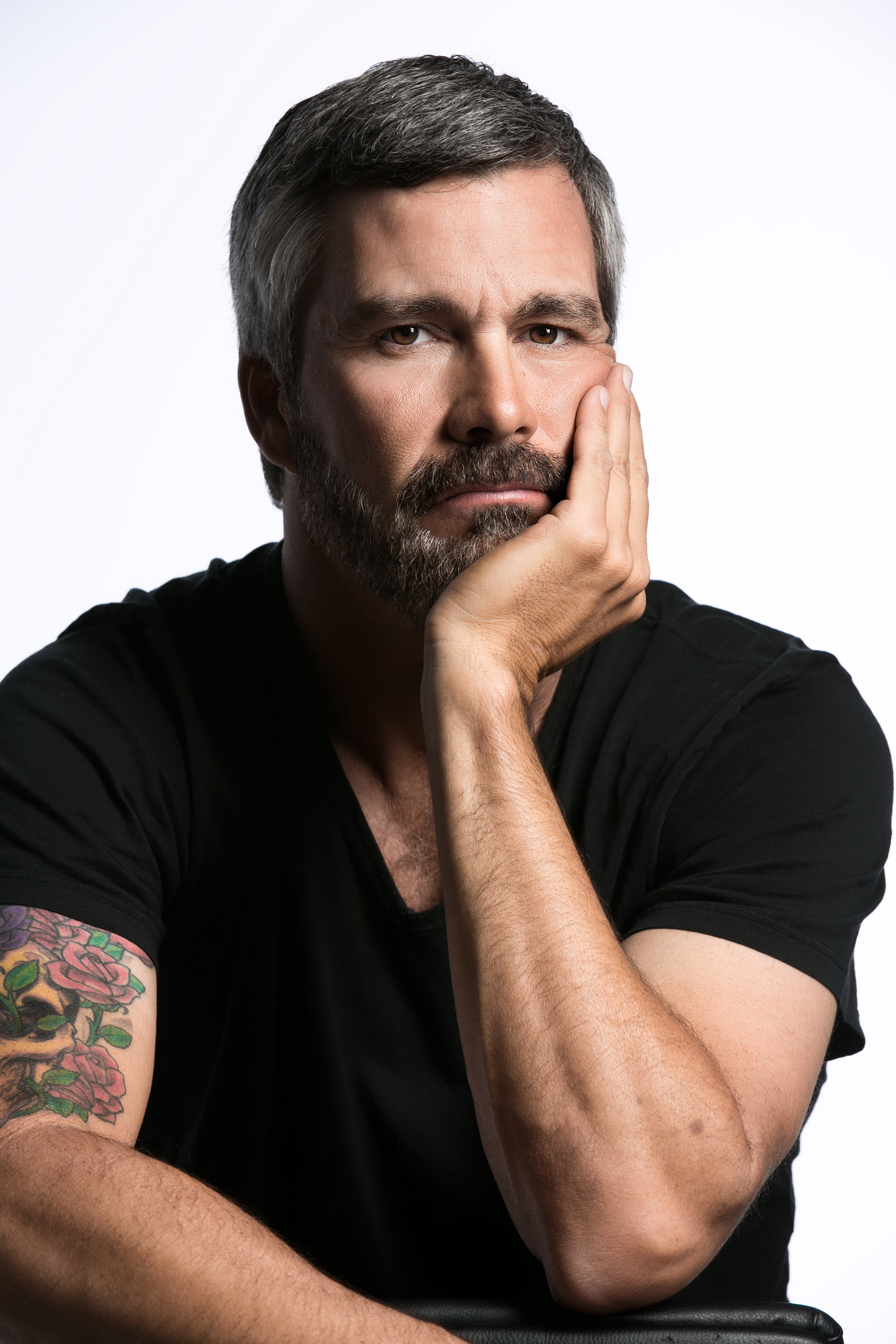
- Born: Tulsa, Oklahoma, U.S.
- Occupations: Actor, comedian
- Years active: 1985–2010
- Website: cortmccown.com

Cort McCown is an American actor.

McCown debuted in the 1985 hit film Teen Wolf with an uncredited, small role as one of Michael J. Fox's character's basketball teammates. He followed that with a supporting role as Quint on the 1987 hit teen film Can't Buy Me Love. In 1989 he had roles on the film Beverly Hills Brats and One Man Force. His last film role was in the 1992 comedy/horror film Auntie Lee's Meat Pies, with Pat Morita.

McCown has also appeared on television shows like Hunter, JAG, Beverly Hills, 90210, and on the soap opera’s Passions and The Young and Restless. In 2010, he returned to TV with a role on the FX sitcom The League. He recently completed a Feature Film with the Sundance Award Winning Barnes Brothers.

In 2001 McCown began touring as a Stand Up Comedian, opening for acts like Andrew Dice Clay and Harland Williams. He is a regular at Los Angeles clubs The World Famous Comedy Store and Laugh Factory. In 2003 McCown created The Playboy Comedy Tour that was at The Palms Hotel in Las Vegas for nine years, winning “Best of Las Vegas” several times. He was also the Morning Show host for Playboy Radio when it debuted on Sirius Satellite Radio.

McCown was recently featured in Vince Vaughn’s Wild West Comedy Festival in Nashville.

In 2014 McCown performed at the prestigious Edinburgh Fringe Festival in the show American…ish, and The Amsterdam International Comedy Festival, as well as a Tour in England.

Currently McCown has a Podcast with fellow Comedian Joe Bartnick titled “Insensitivity Training” on All Things Comedy Network. He can also be seen touring clubs across the country performing Standup Comedy.

Cort can be seen in Showtime's "The Comedy Store" Documentary.

== Filmography ==
| Year | Film | Role | Other notes |
|---|---|---|---|
| 1985 | Teen Wolf | Teammate | Uncredited |
| 1987 | Can't Buy Me Love | Quint | |
| 1989 | Beverly Hills Brats | Bart | |
| 1989 | One Man Force | Young Punk Leader | |
| 1990 | Desire | Luca Renosto | credited as Courtney Allen |
| 1992 | Auntie Lee's Meat Pies | Craig | |
Television
| Year | Title | Role | Notes |
| 1990 | Hunter | Joe Baker | Episode: "The Incident" |
| 1996 | JAG | | Episode: "Recovery" |
| 1999 | Beverly Hills, 90210 | Mike | Episode: "Dog's Best Friend" |
| 2000 | Passions | Robert | 3 episodes |
| 2010 | The League | Pit Boss Joe | Episode: "Vegas Draft" |
