= Loose Women (film) =

- Directed by: Paul F. Bernard
- Written by: Sherry Ham
- Produced by: Paul F. Bernard; Chris Matonti
- Starring: Sherry Ham; Melissa Errico
- Cinematography: Peter Reiners
- Edited by: Marie-Pierre Renaud
- Music by: Pat Irwin
- Release date: November 9, 1996 (FLIFF)
- Running time: 91 minutes
- Country: United States
- Language: English

Loose Women is a 1996 romance/drama film directed by Paul F. Bernard. Sherry Ham-Bernard wrote and starred in the production. Charlie Sheen, Renee Estevez, Keith David, Giancarlo Esposito and Stephan Lang made cameo appearances.

== Cast ==
- Sherry Ham as Rachel
- Melissa Errico as Gail
- Marialisa Costanzo as Tracy
- Corey Glover as Jack
- Tom Verica as Det. Laurent
- Amy Alexandra Lloyd as Ann
- Robin Strasser as Mrs. Hayes
- Renee Estevez as Make-up lady
- Charlie Sheen as Barbie Lover Bartender
- Keith David as Stylist
