= Renée Estevez =

American actress (born 1967)

- Born: Renée Pilar Estévez; April 2, 1967 (age 59); New York City, U.S.
- Other name: Renee Estevez
- Occupation: Actress
- Years active: 1986–2015
- Spouse: Jason Thomas Federico (m. 1997; div. 2011)
- Parent(s): Martin Sheen; Janet Templeton
- Relatives: Emilio Estevez (brother); Ramon Estevez (brother); Charlie Sheen (brother); Joe Estevez (paternal uncle)
- Family: Estevez

Renée Pilar Estevez (born April 2, 1967) is an American actress.

== Early years ==
Estevez was born in New York City, the youngest child and only daughter of artist Janet (née Templeton) and actor Martin Sheen (legally Ramón Estévez). Her father is of Irish and Spanish descent. Her three older brothers are also actors: Emilio Estevez, Ramon Estevez and Charlie Sheen (born Carlos Estévez).

== Career ==
Estevez started her acting career in 1986 starring in a CBS Schoolbreak special, Babies Having Babies. Estevez has had secondary roles in films since 1986's Shattered Spirits, including the character Betty Finn in the cult favorite Heathers. She was the final girl in the horror film Sleepaway Camp II: Unhappy Campers (1988). She has guest starred on JAG and MacGyver. She appeared in a regular guest-starring role on The West Wing as Nancy, an office assistant in the Oval Office of President Josiah Bartlet (who is played by her father Martin Sheen). She has also had cameo roles in her brothers' and father's films, including The Way, an American film starring Martin Sheen and directed by Emilio Estevez. She also wrote for the TV series Anger Management which starred her brother Charlie Sheen.

== Personal life ==
Estevez was married to Jason Thomas Federico, a professional golfer and chef in New York. They met at the California Culinary Academy, where he received a degree in culinary arts and she studied pastry and baking science. They married on October 11, 1997, in a Catholic wedding at the Church of Our Lady of the Scapular–St. Stephen in New York. They were divorced in 2011 in Los Angeles.

== Filmography ==
=== Film ===
Year	Title	Role	Notes
1987	Lethal Weapon	Underage Hooker	Uncredited; director's cut
1988	For Keeps?	Marnie	
1988	Sleepaway Camp II: Unhappy Campers	Molly	
1988	Forbidden Sun	Elaine	
1988	Heathers	Betty Finn	
1989	Intruder	Linda	
1990	Moon 44	Executive	Uncredited
1990	Marked for Murder	Justine	
1992	Single White Female	Perfect Applicant	
1993	Paper Hearts	Kat	
1993	Deadfall	Baby's Babe	Featured role
1993	Good Girls Don't	Jeannie	
1994	Endangered	Andie	
1995	Running Wild	Aimee	
1996	The War at Home	Brenda	
1996	Entertaining Angels: The Dorothy Day Story	Lilly Batterham	
1997	Shadow Conspiracy	—	Cameo
1997	Loose Women	Make-up Lady	Cameo
1998	Scar City	Cop #2	Cameo
1998	No Code of Conduct	Investigating Officer	Uncredited; cameo
1998	A Murder of Crows	Reporter #2	Cameo
1999	Storm	Andrea McIntyre	
1999	A Stranger in the Kingdom	Julia Hefner	
2001	Good Advice	Flight Attendant	Cameo
2002	Out of These Rooms	Renee	
2003	Going Down	Cathy	
2003	Milost mora	Ana Lukovic	
2005	Astrothrill	Sandy and Gale	Video short
2010	The Way	Doreen	
2015	The Kustomonsters Movie	Gale	Voice role; animated web series

=== Television ===
Year(s)	Title	Role	Notes
1986	Shattered Spirits	Girl at Phone	Television film; cameo
1986	CBS Schoolbreak Special	Max	Episode: "Babies Having Babies"
1987	Growing Pains	Robin	Episode: "Higher Education"
1987	Hallmark Hall of Fame	Susan	Episode: "The Room Upstairs"
1987	MacGyver	Kelly Henderson	Episode: "Bushmaster"
1990	ABC Afterschool Special	Becky	
1991	Dead Silence	Zanna Young	Television film
1991	Guilty Until Proven Innocent	Carol McLaughlin	Television film
1992	Red Shoe Diaries	Private Chavez	
1992	Touch and Die	Emma	Television film
1993	A Matter of Justice	Carole	Television film
1998	Addams Family Reunion	Blonde Sharon	Television film
1999–2006	The West Wing	Nancy	Recurring role
2000–2001	JAG	Lt. Crandall / P.O. Daniels	2 episodes
2002	The Division	Shelby's Work Colleague #1	
