= Emilio Estevez =

American actor and filmmaker (born 1962)

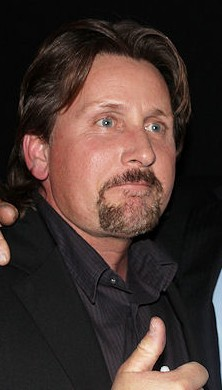
- Estevez in 2011
- Born: May 12, 1962 (age 64); New York City, U.S.
- Occupations: Actor; director; producer; screenwriter
- Years active: 1973–present
- Spouse: Paula Abdul (m. 1992; div. 1994)
- Children: 2
- Parents: Martin Sheen (father); Janet Templeton (mother)
- Relatives: Ramon Estevez (brother); Charlie Sheen (brother); Renée Estevez (sister); Joe Estevez (paternal uncle)
- Family: Estevez

Emilio Estevez (/ɛˈmɪlioʊ ɛˈstəvɛs/; born May 12, 1962) is an American actor and filmmaker. The son of actor Martin Sheen and the older brother of Charlie Sheen, he made his film debut with an uncredited role in Badlands (1973). He later received his first credited appearance with a supporting role in the coming-of-age film Tex (1982).

Estevez gained mainstream recognition with a starring role in the drama film The Outsiders (1983), leading him to be associated with a group of young actors known as the "Brat Pack". After starring in the films Nightmares (1983) and Repo Man (1984), Estevez had his breakout with starring roles in the commercially successful Brat Pack films The Breakfast Club (1985) and St. Elmo's Fire (1985). Following his breakout, he starred in the films Maximum Overdrive (1986), Stakeout (1987), Young Guns (1988), and Young Guns II (1990). In the 1990s, Estevez played the lead role of Gordon Bombay in the film series The Mighty Ducks (1992–1996). He also starred in the films Freejack (1992), Loaded Weapon 1 (1993), Another Stakeout (1993), and Judgment Night (1993).

Estevez made his directorial debut with the crime film Wisdom (1986), which he also starred in. He later directed and starred in the films Men at Work (1990) and The War at Home (1996), and following the final film in the Mighty Ducks series, Estevez primarily focused on directorial work. He directed and starred in the drama film Bobby (2006), which was nominated for the Golden Globe Award for Best Motion Picture – Drama, and also earned Estevez a Screen Actors Guild Award nomination. He also directed and starred in the films The Way (2010) and The Public (2018).

Outside of directing in recent years, Estevez had a starring voice role in the English dub of the fantasy film Arthur and the Invisibles (2006) and reprised his role as Gordon Bombay in a regular capacity on the Disney+ television series The Mighty Ducks: Game Changers (2021–2022).

== Early life ==
Estevez was born in the Bronx, the eldest child of artist Janet Sheen and actor Martin Sheen (legally Ramón Estévez). His siblings are Ramon Estevez, Charlie Sheen (born Carlos Estévez) and Renée Estevez. Estevez's paternal grandparents were Irish and Spanish immigrants. His father is a "devout Catholic" and his mother is a "strict Southern Baptist".

Estevez initially attended school in the New York City public school system but transferred to a private academy once his father's career took off. He lived on Manhattan's Upper West Side until his family moved west in 1968 when his father was cast in Catch-22. Growing up in Malibu, California, Estevez attended Santa Monica High School.

When Estevez was 11 years old, his father bought the family a portable movie camera. Estevez also appeared in Meet Mr. Bomb, a short anti-nuclear power film produced at his high school. Estevez was 14 when he accompanied his father to the Philippines, where Sheen was shooting Apocalypse Now. Estevez had a role as an extra in Apocalypse Now, but his scenes were deleted.

When they returned to Los Angeles, Estevez co-wrote and starred in a high school play about Vietnam veterans called Echoes of an Era and invited his parents to watch it. Sheen recalls being astonished by his son's performance, and "began to realize: my God, he's one of us." After graduating from Santa Monica High School in 1980, he refused to go to college and instead went into acting. Unlike his brother Charlie, Estevez and his other siblings did not adopt their father's stage name. Emilio reportedly liked the alliteration of the double 'E' initials, and "didn't want to ride into the business as 'Martin Sheen's son'." Upon his brother's using his birth name Carlos Estevez for the film Machete Kills, Estevez mentioned that he was proud of his Spanish heritage and was glad that he never adopted a stage name, taking advice from his father who regretted adopting the name Martin Sheen as opposed to using his birth name, Ramón Estévez.

== Career ==
Estevez's first role was in a drama produced by the Catholic Paulist order. Soon after, he made his stage debut with his father in Mister Roberts at Burt Reynolds' dinner theater in Jupiter, Florida (this was the only job his father ever placed him in). Later, father and son worked together in the 1982 ABC-TV film about juveniles in jail, In the Custody of Strangers, in which Estevez did the casting.

=== Brat Pack years ===
Estevez received much attention during the 1980s for being a member of the Brat Pack and was credited as the leader of the group of young actors. One of his first major roles was as Keith "Two-Bit" Mathews in Francis Ford Coppola's 1983 cinematic adaptation of S. E. Hinton's novel, The Outsiders, where he shared the screen with an ensemble cast that included Tom Cruise, Matt Dillon, Leif Garrett, C. Thomas Howell, Diane Lane, Rob Lowe, Ralph Macchio and Patrick Swayze. Besides his roles in In the Custody of Strangers and The Outsiders, his credits include NBC-TV's thrillers Nightmares and Tex, the 1982 film version of another S.E. Hinton story. He bought the movie rights to a third Hinton book, That Was Then, This Is Now, and wrote the screenplay. His father predicted he would have to direct to feel the full extent of his talents, describing him as "an officer, not a soldier."

After The Outsiders, Estevez appeared as the punk-rocker turned car-repossessor Otto Maddox in the film Repo Man before co-starring in The Breakfast Club and St. Elmo's Fire. Following the success of these back-to-back Brat Pack films, he starred in That Was Then... This Is Now (which he co-wrote), the horror film Maximum Overdrive (for which he was nominated for a Golden Raspberry Award for Worst Actor), and the crime drama Wisdom (with fellow Brat Packer Demi Moore). Estevez was originally cast in Platoon to be Private Chris Taylor but was forced to drop out after production was delayed for two years; the role eventually went to his younger brother Charlie Sheen. He went on to lead roles in the comedy/action film Stakeout and the westerns Young Guns and Young Guns II.

=== 1990–present ===
In the early 1990s, Estevez directed, wrote and starred with his brother Charlie in a comedy about garbage men, Men at Work. Estevez later stated, "People come up to me on the street and say, Men at Work is the funniest movie I ever saw in my life. But, you know, I do have to question how many movies these people have seen."

In 1992, Estevez found the career longevity that escaped some other Brat Packers by starring in The Mighty Ducks as Coach Gordon Bombay, a lawyer and former pee wee star and minor hockey prodigy looking to forget the past, forced into coaching a pee wee hockey team as a form of community service. The film turned out to be one of Disney's most successful franchises. It was followed by two sequels. The following year Estevez starred in three films: the dark thriller Judgment Night, the spoof comedy Loaded Weapon 1 in which his brother Charlie Sheen has a cameo and comedy/action film Another Stakeout, which was the sequel to his earlier film Stakeout.

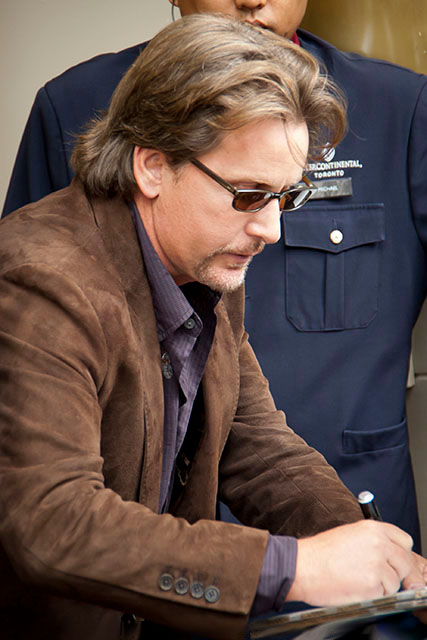
Estevez at the 2010 Toronto International Film Festival

Estevez has acted alongside his father several times. He starred in (and directed) the 1996 The War at Home in which he played Jeremy Collier, a Vietnam War veteran dealing with posttraumatic stress disorder, while Martin Sheen played his unsympathetic father Bob.

Estevez appeared in an uncredited role in the feature film Mission: Impossible. From 1998 to 1999, he appeared in three television films: the spaghetti Western Dollar for the Dead (1998), the comedy Late Last Night (1999) and Rated X (2000), which he directed. In 2000, Estevez starred in the Moxie! Award-winning thriller Sand as part of an ensemble cast that also included Denis Leary, Jon Lovitz, Harry Dean Stanton and Julie Delpy.

In 2003, Estevez made his voice acting debut when he helped create the English dubbed version of The 3 Wise Men with his father. Later, Estevez starred in The L.A. Riot Spectacular and voiced the English version of the film Arthur and the Invisibles. In 2008, he guest-starred on his brother's sitcom Two and a Half Men as Andy Patterson, an old friend of Charlie Sheen's character Charlie Harper. (His father Martin Sheen had also guest-starred in 2005.)

In an interview a month after the tribute to John Hughes at the 82nd Academy Awards, Estevez explained his absence as publicity shyness: "I've never been a guy that went out there to get publicity on myself. I never saw the value in it." In 2017, his appearance in films was found to generate the highest return on investment (ROI) on average of all Hollywood actors.

Estevez reprised his role as Coach Gordon Bombay in the 2021 Disney+ TV series, The Mighty Ducks: Game Changers. It was reported in November 2021 that Estevez would not return in the show's second season due to a contract dispute and creative differences.

=== Directing career ===
Aside from acting, Estevez has also directed television shows and motion pictures. He made his directorial debut with the 1986 film Wisdom, which made Estevez the youngest actor ever to write, direct and star in a single major motion picture. Most recently he has directed episodes of the television series Cold Case, Close to Home, The Guardian, CSI: NY and Numb3rs. The films he has directed include Men at Work and The War at Home.

He directed the 2006 film Bobby, which took over six years to write. Producing the film nearly bankrupted him as the domestic box office gross was not able to cover production costs. The movie gained him fans outside the US, mainly in Europe. He won a Hollywood Film Award and received a seven-minute standing ovation at the Venice Film Festival.

In 2010, Estevez filmed a new project, The Way, in Spain where he directed his father in a story about Thomas Avery, a man who decides to make the Camino de Santiago after the death of his son Daniel in the French Pyrénées. It was released in the United States on October 7, 2011.

In 2018, Estevez released The Public, a film featuring Estevez himself as writer, director and cast member. The film, also starring Alec Baldwin, Christian Slater and Jena Malone, premiered worldwide at the 2018 Toronto International Film Festival.

=== Music videos ===
Estevez appeared in John Parr's "St. Elmo's Fire (Man in Motion)" music video, from the soundtrack of his film with the same name, where he played Kirby Keger. The music video featured all seven of the main cast members of the film, looking sadly through the foggy windows of a run-down and fire-damaged version of the St. Elmo's Bar set.

Estevez is a close friend of Jon Bon Jovi. He appeared in Bon Jovi's music video "Blaze of Glory" as Billy the Kid. In turn, Bon Jovi made a cameo appearance in Young Guns II. "Blaze of Glory" was in the Young Guns II soundtrack and was nominated for an Academy Award for Best Original Song at the 63rd Academy Awards. In 2000, Estevez made an appearance in another Bon Jovi video, "Say It Isn't So", along with Matt LeBlanc, Claudia Schiffer and Arnold Schwarzenegger.

== Personal life ==
In the early 1980s, Estevez dated actress Mimi Rogers. He was involved off and on with Carey Salley, a Wilhelmina model. They have a son and a daughter. Their relationship overlapped with Estevez's high-profile engagement to Demi Moore, with whom he was intermittently involved from 1984 to 1986. In 1986, Salley filed a $2 million paternity suit against Estevez. Estevez acknowledged paternity of Salley's children on June 1, 1987.

On April 29, 1992, Estevez married singer-choreographer Paula Abdul. They filed for divorce in May 1994. Abdul later stated that the reason for the divorce was that she wanted children, while Estevez–who already had two children–did not.

In 2011, Estevez stated that his religion was a "work in progress". In 2023, he said, "Film is an illusion, fame is ephemeral, faith and family are what will endure".

== Filmography ==
=== Film ===
Film
Year	Film	Role	Notes
1973	Badlands	Boy Under Lamppost	Uncredited role
1979	Apocalypse Now	Messenger Boy	Scenes deleted
1982	Tex	Johnny Collins	
1983	The Outsiders	Keith "Two-Bit" Mathews	
1983	Nightmares	J.J. Cooney	Segment: "The Bishop of Battle"
1984	Repo Man	Otto Maddox	
1985	The Breakfast Club	Andrew Clark	
1985	St. Elmo's Fire	Kirby "Kirbo" Keger	
1985	That Was Then... This Is Now	Mark Jennings	Also writer
1986	Maximum Overdrive	Bill Robinson	
1986	Wisdom	John Wisdom	Also director and writer
1987	Stakeout	Det. Bill Reimers	
1988	Young Guns	Billy the Kid	
1989	Never on Tuesday	Tow Truck Driver	Cameo role
1990	Young Guns II	Billy the Kid	
1990	Men at Work	James St. James	Also director and writer
1992	Freejack	Alex Furlong	
1992	The Mighty Ducks	Gordon Bombay	
1993	Loaded Weapon 1	Sgt. Jack Colt	
1993	Another Stakeout	Det. Bill Reimers	
1993	Judgment Night	Francis Howard "Frank" Wyatt	
1994	D2: The Mighty Ducks	Gordon Bombay	
1995	The Jerky Boys: The Movie	—N/a	Executive producer
1996	Mission: Impossible	Jack Harmon	Uncredited role
1996	The War at Home	Jeremy Collier	Also director and producer
1996	D3: The Mighty Ducks	Gordon Bombay	
2000	Sand	Trip	
2003	The 3 Wise Men	Belial	Uncredited voice role, English dub
2005	The L.A. Riot Spectacular	Laurence Powell	
2005	Culture Clash in America	—N/a	Director, Documentary
2006	Arthur and the Minimoys	Ferryman	Voice role, English dub
2006	Bobby	Tim Fallon	Also director and writer
2010	The Way	Daniel Avery	Also director, producer and writer
2012	Dear Dracula	Myro	Voice role
2012	A Monster Christmas	Mr. Winterbottom	Voice role
2018	The Public	Stuart Goodson	Also director and writer
2024	Brats	Himself	Documentary

=== Television ===
Television
Year	Title	Role	Notes
1980–1982	Insight	Young Man / Pat / Stan / Steve Novak	4 episodes
1982	To Climb a Mountain	Steve Novak	Television film
1982	Making the Grade	Dwayne	Episode: "Guess Who's Coming to Class?"
1982	In the Custody of Strangers	Danny Caldwell	Television film
1987	Funny, You Don't Look 200: A Constitutional Vaudeville	Himself / Vietnam Soldier	Television special
1989	Nightbreaker	Young Dr. Alexander Brown	Television film
1994	Saturday Night Live	Host	Episode: "Emilio Estevez/Pearl Jam"
1994	The Legend of Billy the Kid	Himself	Television special
1996	The Single Guy	Himself	Episode: "Wedding"
1998	Dollar for the Dead	Cowboy	Television film
1999	Late Last Night	Dan	Television film
2000	Rated X	James Lowell "Jim" Mitchell	Television film, Also director
2001	Jon Bon Jovi	Himself / Interviewee	Television special
2002	After Dark: South Beach	Narrator	Television special
2003	The West Wing	Young Josiah "Jed" Bartlet	Episode: "Twenty Five"
2003–2004	The Guardian	—N/a	Director, 3 episodes
2004–2005	Cold Case	—N/a	Director, 2 episodes
2005	CSI: NY	—N/a	Director, 2 episodes
2005	Close to Home	—N/a	Director, Episode: "Baseball Murder"
2008	Numb3rs	—N/a	Director, 2 episodes
2008	Two and a Half Men	Andrew "Andy" Donald Patterson	Episode: "The Devil's Lube"
2017	Nirvanna the Band the Show	Himself	Episode: "The Big Time"
2021	The Mighty Ducks: Game Changers	Gordon Bombay	Main cast (10 episodes)

== Awards and nominations ==
Emilio Estevez awards and nominations
Awards and nominations
Award	Wins	Nominations
Golden Globe	0	1
Broadcast Film Critics Association Awards	0	1
Screen Actors Guild Awards	0	1
ALMA Awards	0	5
Golden Raspberry Awards	0	1
Shorty Awards	0	2
Venice Film Festival	1	2
Western Heritage Awards	1	1

Totals (Note: Certain award groups do not simply award one winner. They acknowledge several different recipients, have runners-up, and have third place. Since this is a specific recognition and is different from losing an award, runner-up mentions are considered wins in this award tally. For simplification and to avoid errors, each award in this list has been presumed to have had a prior nomination.)
- Wins: 2
- Nominations: 14

Year	Nominated work	Award	Category	Result
1986	Maximum Overdrive	Golden Raspberry Awards	Worst Actor	Nominated
1989	Young Guns	Western Heritage Awards	Bronze Wrangler - Theatrical Motion Picture	Won
1998	The War at Home	ALMA Awards	Outstanding Latino Director of a Feature Film	Nominated
1998	The War at Home	ALMA Awards	Outstanding Individual Performance in a Crossover Role in a Feature Film	Nominated
2006	Bobby	Venice Film Festival	Golden Lion - Best Film	Nominated
2006	Bobby	Venice Film Festival	Biografilm Award	Won
2006	Bobby	Broadcast Film Critics Association Awards	Best Cast	Nominated
2006	Bobby	Screen Actors Guild Awards	Outstanding Performance by a Cast in a Motion Picture	Nominated
2006	Bobby	ALMA Awards	Outstanding Director – Motion Picture	Nominated
2006	Bobby	ALMA Awards	Outstanding Motion Picture	Nominated
2006	Bobby	ALMA Awards	Outstanding Screenplay – Motion Picture	Nominated
2012	Emilio Estevez	Shorty Awards	Best Actor	Nominated
2012	Emilio Estevez	Shorty Awards	Best Director	Nominated

== See also ==
- List of celebrities who own wineries and vineyards

Awards and achievements
Bronze Wrangler Awards
Preceded by Carroll Ballard for Never Cry Wolf	Bronze Wrangler for Theatrical Motion Picture; 1989 for Young Guns	Succeeded by Kevin Costner, Jim Wilson & Rodney A. Grant for Dances With Wolves
