= List of awards and nominations received by Charlie Sheen =

The following is a list of awards and nominations for American actor Charlie Sheen. He won a Golden Globe award for Best Lead Actor in a Television Series - Comedy or Musical for his performance as Charlie Crawford on Spin City in 2002, and received two further nominations in 2005 and 2006 in the same category for his performance as Charlie Harper on Two and a Half Men. He has been nominated for four Primetime Emmy awards for Outstanding Lead Actor in a Comedy Series for the same role; these came in 2006, 2007, 2008, and 2009. Sheen also shared a Screen Actors Guild award nomination for Outstanding Performance by an Ensemble in a Motion Picture for Being John Malkovich in 2000, and received two nominations for Outstanding Performance by a Male Actor in a Comedy Series in 2005 and 2010. He was honored with a star on the Hollywood Walk of Fame for his contribution to Motion Picture in 1994.<

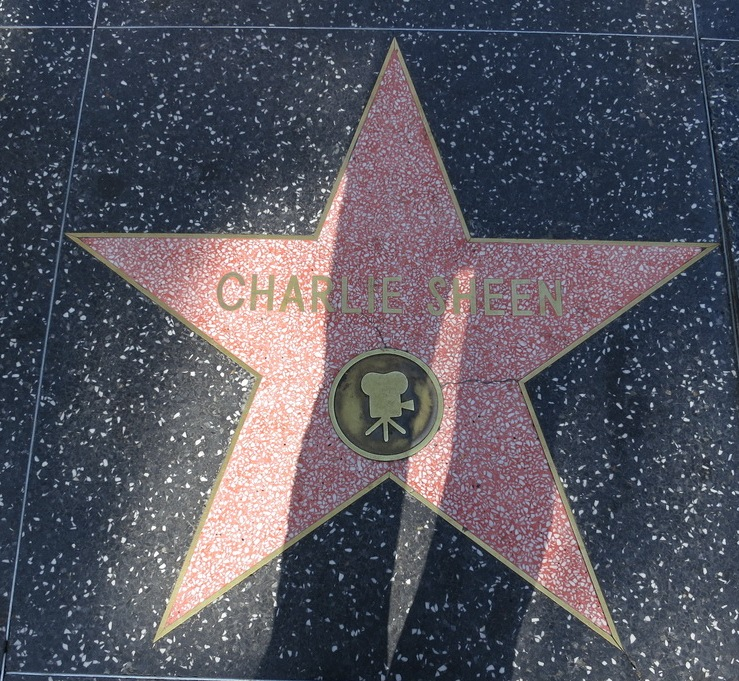
Sheen's star on the Hollywood Walk of Fame - Motion Picture 7201 Hollywood, Blvd.

== Prestigious awards ==
=== Golden Globe Awards ===
1 win of 3 nominations

Year	Category	Title	Results	Lost to	Ref.
2002	Best Lead Actor in a Television Series - Comedy or Musical	Spin City	Won		
2005	Best Lead Actor in a Television Series - Comedy or Musical	Two and a Half Men	Nominated	Jason Bateman (Arrested Development)	
2006	Best Lead Actor in a Television Series - Comedy or Musical	Two and a Half Men	Nominated	Steve Carell (The Office)	

=== Primetime Emmy awards ===
0 wins of 4 nominations

Year	Category	Title	Results	Lost to	Ref.
2006	Outstanding Lead Actor in a Comedy Series	Two and a Half Men	Nominated	Tony Shalhoub (Monk)	
2007	Outstanding Lead Actor in a Comedy Series	Two and a Half Men	Nominated	Ricky Gervais (Extras)	
2008	Outstanding Lead Actor in a Comedy Series	Two and a Half Men	Nominated	Alec Baldwin (30 Rock)	
2009	Outstanding Lead Actor in a Comedy Series	Two and a Half Men	Nominated	Alec Baldwin (30 Rock)	

=== Screen Actors Guild awards ===
0 wins of 3 nominations

Year	Category	Title	Results	Lost to	Ref.
2000	Outstanding Performance by an Ensemble in a Motion Picture	Being John Malkovich	Nominated	Cast of (American Beauty)	
2005	Outstanding Performance by a Male Actor in a Comedy Series	Two and a Half Men	Nominated	Tony Shalhoub (Monk)	
2010	Outstanding Performance by a Male Actor in a Comedy Series	Two and a Half Men	Nominated	Alec Baldwin (30 Rock)	

== Audience awards ==
=== Nickelodeon Kids' Choice awards ===
0 wins of 1 nomination

Year	Category	Title	Results	Lost to	Ref.
2007	Favorite Television Actor	Two and a Half Men	Nominated	Drake Bell (Drake & Josh)	

=== People's Choice awards ===
0 wins of 4 nominations

Year	Category	Title	Results	Lost to	Ref.
2006	Favorite Male Television Star	Two and Half Men	Nominated	Ray Romano (Everybody Loves Raymond)	
2007	Favorite Male Television Star	Two and Half Men	Nominated	Patrick Dempsey (Grey's Anatomy)	
2008	Favorite Male Television Star	Two and Half Men	Nominated	Patrick Dempsey (Grey's Anatomy)	
2009	Favorite Male Television Star	Two and Half Men	Nominated	Hugh Laurie (House)	

=== Teen Choice awards ===
0 wins of 3 nominations

Year	Category	Title	Results	Lost to	Ref.
2007	Choice TV Actor - Comedy	Two and a Half Men	Nominated	Steve Carell (The Office)	
2008	Choice TV Actor - Comedy	Two and a Half Men	Nominated	Steve Carell (The Office)	
2009	Choice TV Actor - Comedy	Two and a Half Men	Nominated	Jonas Brothers (Jonas)	

== Critic and association awards ==
=== Award Circuit Community awards ===
0 wins of 1 nomination

Year	Category	Title	Results	Lost to	Ref.
1999	Best Ensemble	Being John Malkovich	Nominated	Cast of (Magnolia)	

== International awards ==
=== ALMA awards ===
1 win of 5 nominations

Year	Category	Title	Results	Lost to	Ref.
2001	Outstanding Actor in a Television Series	Spin City	Nominated	Martin Sheen (The West Wing)	
2002	Outstanding Actor in a Television Series	Spin City	Nominated	Esai Morales (NYPD Blue)	
2008	Outstanding Male Performance in a Comedy Television Series	Two and a Half Men	Won		
2009	Outstanding Actor in a Comedy Series	Two and a Half Men	Nominated	Oscar Nunez (The Office)	
2012	Favorite Television Actor - Leading Role	Anger Management	Nominated	Tyler Posey (Teen Wolf)	

== Miscellaneous awards ==
=== Golden Raspberry awards ===
0 wins of 1 nomination

Year	Category	Title	Results	Lost to	Ref.
2014	Worst Screen Couple (shared with Lindsay Lohan)	Scary Movie 5	Nominated	Jaden Smith, Will Smith (After Earth)	

=== TV Land awards ===
1 win of 1 nomination

Year	Category	Title	Results	Ref.
2009	Future Classic award	Two and a Half Men	Won	

=== Walk of Fame Star ===
1 win of 1 nomination

Year	Category	Title	Results	Ref.
1994	Star on the Walk of Fame - Motion Picture, 7021 Hollywood, Blvd.	Charlie Sheen	Won	

=== Western Heritage awards ===
1 win of 1 nomination

Year	Category	Title	Results	Ref.
1989	Theatrical Motion Picture	Young Guns	Won	
