= Cadence (film) =

1990 film by Martin Sheen

- Promotional movie poster
- Directed by: Martin Sheen
- Written by: Dennis Shryack
- Produced by: Timothy Gamble; Frank Giustra; Peter E. Strauss
- Starring: Charlie Sheen; Martin Sheen; Larry Fishburne; Michael Beach; Ramon Estevez
- Cinematography: Richard Leiterman
- Edited by: Martin Hunter
- Music by: Georges Delerue
- Distributed by: New Line Cinema; Republic Pictures
- Release dates: 1990 (Deauville Film Festival); January 18, 1991 (United States)
- Running time: 97 minutes
- Country: United States
- Language: English
- Budget: $8.5 million
- Box office: $2.1 million

Cadence is a 1990 American historical prison film directed by Martin Sheen, in which Charlie Sheen plays an inmate in a United States Army military prison in West Germany during the 1960s. Sheen plays alongside his father Martin Sheen and brother Ramon Estevez. The film is based on a novel by Gordon Weaver.

== Plot ==
Franklin Bean, an Army private, is sentenced to 90 days in the stockade for drunkenly assaulting a military policeman on his base in West Germany in the 1960s. Master Sergeant McKinney is the stockade commander who takes a dislike to the rebellious Bean.

== Cast ==
- Charlie Sheen as Pfc. Franklin Fairchild Bean
- Martin Sheen as MSgt. Otis V. McKinney
- Larry Fishburne as Cpl. Roosevelt Stokes
- Michael Beach as Webb
- James Marshall as Cpl. Harold Lamar
- Ramon Estevez as Cpl. Gerald Gessner
- Blu Mankuma as Bryce
- Harry Stewart as Pvt. Harry 'Sweetbread' Crane
- John Toles-Bey as Lawrence
- Jay Brazeau as Mr. Vito
- Samantha Langevin as Mrs. Vito
- Ken Douglas as Kramer
- Weston McMillan as DeLuc
- David Michael O'Neill as Sager
- Allan Lysell as Sheridan
- Joe Lowry as Haig
- Roark Critchlow as Brooks
- Alec Burden as Abel Fox
- Steven Hilton as Col. Clark
- Lochlyn Munro as Bartender
- Tom McBeath as Principal
- Jennifer Griffin as Tattoo Woman
- Brent Stait as MP
- Deryl Hayes as MP in bar
- Tony Pantages as GI in bar
- Christopher Judge as Psych. Ward M.P. #1
- Matt Clark as Franklin F. Bean, Sr.
- Robert Gazzola as Bean (age 8)
- David Glyn-Jones as Funeral Director
- F. Murray Abraham as Capt. Ramon Garcia

== Production ==
Seventh United States Army shoulder sleeve distinct insignia

All soldiers wear the shoulder sleeve distinct insignia of the Seventh United States Army. Martin Sheen received a Critics Award nomination at the Deauville Film Festival 1990. Filming locations were Kamloops and Ashcroft, British Columbia (both in Canada) between July and August 1989.

== Reception ==
On Rotten Tomatoes the film has an approval rating of 46% based on reviews from 13 critics. On Metacritic it has a score of 44% based on reviews from 16 critics, indicating "mixed or average" reviews.
