= Aka Charlie Sheen =

2025 two-part documentary miniseries

aka Charlie Sheen
- Genre: Documentary
- Directed by: Andrew Renzi
- Composers: Chase Deso; Julia Piker
- Country of origin: United States
- Original language: English
- No. of episodes: 2

Production
- Executive producers: Toby Emmerich; Richard Lichter; Michael Minahan; Vivian Johnson Rogowski
- Producers: Andrew Renzi; Charles Roven; Jesse Sisgold; Jon Weinbach; Jordan Wynn; Andrew Fried; Dane Lillegard; Madison Weireter
- Production companies: Atlas Independent; Boardwalk Pictures; North of Now Group; Skydance Television

Original release
- Network: Netflix
- Release: September 10, 2025

aka Charlie Sheen is a 2025 two-part documentary miniseries that explores the life of actor Charlie Sheen. Episode 1, "Part One", has a runtime of 93 minutes. Episode 2, "Part Deux", has a runtime of 88 minutes.

== Summary ==
The two-part documentary film explores Sheen's early life and career, then delves into his partying, substance abuse, the people who enabled him, and his time in rehab. It concludes with a reflection on public fallout stemming from his celebrity status, natural talent, drug use, and rumors, and how the now infamous 'Tiger Blood' interview affected his family, including his children, ex-wives, friends, and colleagues in the industry, most notably Chuck Lorre and Jon Cryer, who worked with him on the popular television series Two and a Half Men.

== Production ==
The documentary series was announced in August 2025, when Netflix ordered a documentary series that explored the life of Two and a Half Men actor Charlie Sheen entitled aka Charlie Sheen, the documentary was being produced by Skydance Media's television production arm Skydance Television with Andrew Renzi serving as the director & producer of the series with his premium documentary production banner Boardwalk Pictures producing the documentary mini-series. The film was backed by Toby Emmerich's Fireside Access TV.

== Reception ==
=== Critical response ===
On the review aggregator website Rotten Tomatoes, the series holds a 73% approval rating, based on 15 critic reviews. Metacritic, which uses a weighted average, assigned a score of 57 out of 100, based on 6 critics, indicating "mixed or average" reviews.

=== Awards and nominations ===
Year	Award	Category	Recipient(s)	Result	Ref.
2026	ACE Eddie Awards	Best Edited Documentary Series	Ed Greene (for "Part One")	Nominated	
2026	Astra TV Awards	Best Documentary TV Movie	aka Charlie Sheen	Nominated	
2026	Producers Guild of America Awards	Outstanding Producer of Non-Fiction Television	Andrew Renzi, Charles Roven, Nick Boak, Madison Weireter, Jesse Sisgold, Jon Weinbach, Jordan Wynn, Andrew Fried, Dane Lillegard, Talin P. Middleton, Michael Minahan, and Vivian Johnson Rogowski	Nominated	
