= In the Custody of Strangers =

1982 television film by Robert Greenwald

- Genre: Drama
- Written by: Jennifer Miller
- Directed by: Robert Greenwald
- Starring: Martin Sheen; Jane Alexander; Emilio Estevez; Ed Lauter
- Music by: Matthew McCauley
- Country of origin: United States
- Original language: English

Production
- Producer: Farnk Von Zerneck
- Cinematography: Isidore Mankofsky
- Editor: Robert Florio
- Running time: 120 minutes
- Production companies: Moonlight Productions; Filmways Television

Original release
- Network: ABC
- Release: May 26, 1982

In the Custody of Strangers is a 1982 American made-for-television drama film. It was directed by Robert Greenwald and written by Jennifer Miller. The film stars Martin Sheen, Jane Alexander, and Emilio Estevez, the latter in his feature film debut. The film was nominated for the Golden Globe Award for Best Mini-Series Or Motion Picture Made for Television but lost to Brideshead Revisited.

== Plot ==
Danny Caldwell is an angry small-town teen whose father, Frank, has been laid off and can't find a decent job. His mother, Sandy, works in order to provide for the family of five. Danny, frustrated with the town, tries to get work or leave the town to find a decent job, but often butts heads with Frank, whose staunch perception is that allowing his son to go to work is a threat to his masculinity. In other words, a father should provide for the family, not his wife, and certainly not the boy.

So, Danny and Frank are frequently at odds and, as a result, the teen indulges in a lot of trouble including criminal mischief and petty theft. One night, while Danny is out joyriding while drunk, he hits a police car, and it lands him in jail. Frank supposes that maybe a night in jail is just what Danny needs to straighten up. However, due to subsequent events that happen while Danny is incarcerated, he ends up spending six weeks in jail on assault charges. He struggles with a backed up probation department, isolation due to laws prohibiting contact between juvenile and adult prisoners under the guise of protection and a frustrated warden played excellently by Kenneth McMillan who wants nothing more than to keep Danny out of the adult jail, but whose hands are tied by the court.

Meanwhile, Frank gets a job in Ohio and the family has to move. At Danny's trial, the assault charges are dropped and he is charged only with drunk driving and operating without a license. He is sentenced to time served and released. His parents realize the mistake of leaving their son in jail, and tell the people in the courtroom that they really need to change how they treat children that come to them. Danny returns home to his family, but is forever changed by his time in jail.

== Cast ==
- Martin Sheen as Frank Caldwell
- Jane Alexander as Sandy Caldwell
- Emilio Estevez as Danny Caldwell
- Kenneth McMillan as Albert C. Caruso
- Ed Lauter as Judge Halloran
- Matt Clark as Mike Raines
- Virginia Kiser as Dr. Forman
- Jon Van Ness as Corky
- John Hancock as Judge Bennett
- Deborah Foreman as Karen
- Susan Peretz as Big Faye
- Peter Jurasik as Andy Barnes
- Judyann Elder as Marni Blake, Prosecutor
