= Charlie Sheen =

American film and television actor (born 1965)

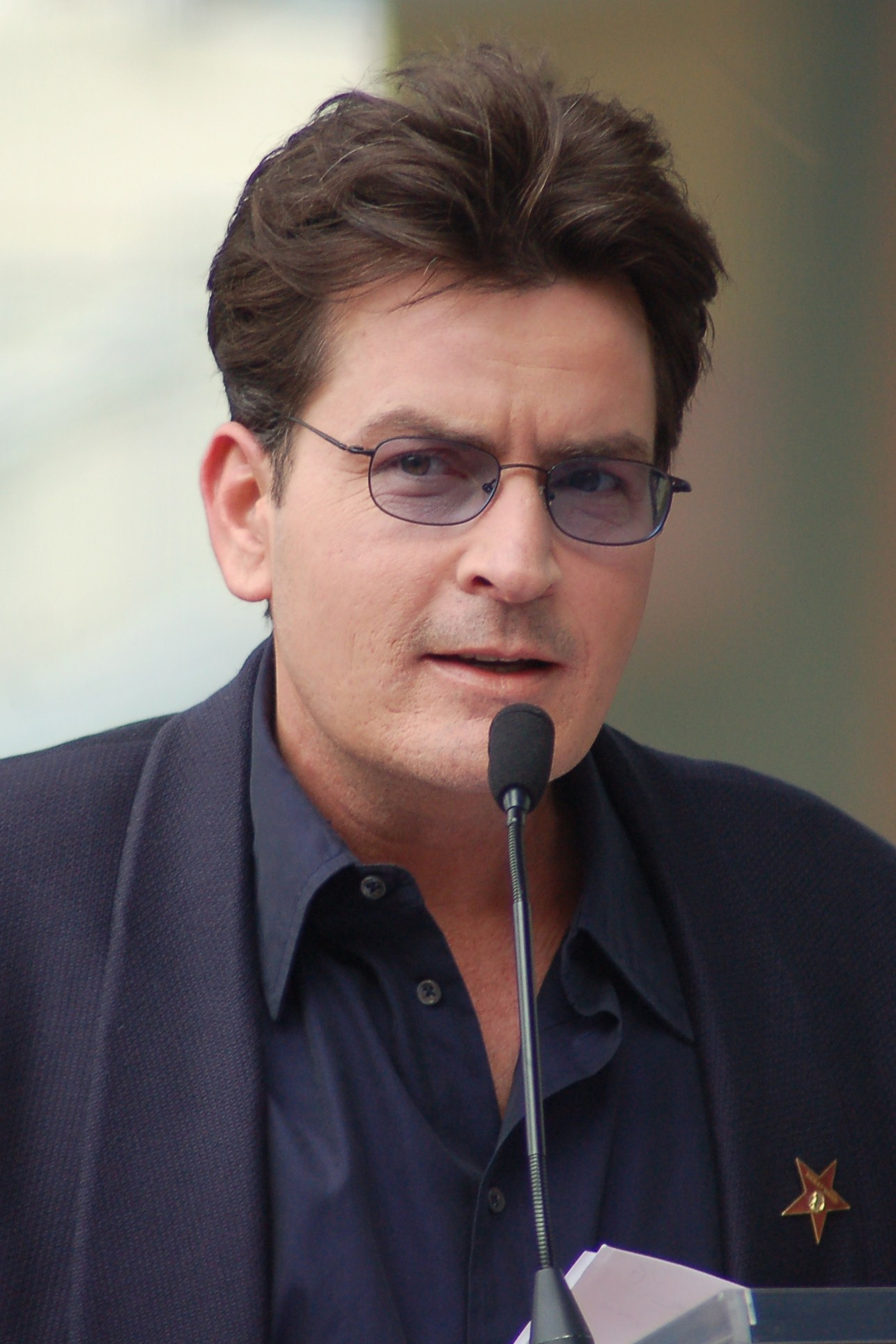
- Sheen in 2009
- Born: Carlos Irwin Estévez; September 3, 1965 (age 61); New York City, U.S.
- Occupation: Actor
- Years active: 1973–present
- Spouses: Donna Peele (m. 1995; div. 1996) Denise Richards (m. 2002; div. 2006) Brooke Mueller (m. 2008; div. 2011)
- Children: 5
- Parents: Martin Sheen; Janet Templeton
- Relatives: Ramon Estevez (brother); Emilio Estevez (brother); Renée Estevez (sister); Joe Estevez (uncle)
- Awards: Full list

Carlos Irwin Estévez (born September 3, 1965), known professionally as Charlie Sheen, is an American actor. A leading man in film and television, his accolades include a Golden Globe as well as nominations for four Primetime Emmy Awards and three Actor Awards. In 1994, Sheen received a star on the Hollywood Walk of Fame.

Following in the footsteps of his father Martin Sheen to become an actor, Charlie Sheen made his first credited film appearance in the war drama Red Dawn (1984). He began to gain wider attention and critical acclaim for his dramatic performances in The Boys Next Door (1985), Platoon (1986), Lucas (1986), and Wall Street (1987), as well as for his comedic work in Ferris Bueller's Day Off (1986), Major League (1989), and Hot Shots! (1991). His other notable film roles include Eight Men Out (1988), Young Guns (1988), The Rookie (1990), The Three Musketeers (1993), The Arrival (1996), Being John Malkovich (1999), and Scary Movie 3 (2003). In 2000, Sheen replaced Michael J. Fox as the star of ABC's Spin City (2000–2002), portraying Charlie Crawford. He then starred as Charlie Harper on the CBS sitcom Two and a Half Men (2003–2011). In 2010, Sheen was the highest-paid actor on television, earning US$1.8 million per episode of Two and a Half Men.

In March 2011, Sheen was terminated from his Two and a Half Men contract by CBS and Warner Bros. following public substance-abuse problems, marital difficulties and comments made towards the series' creator, Chuck Lorre. In 2015, Sheen publicly revealed that he was HIV positive, which led to an increase in HIV prevention and testing that was dubbed the "Charlie Sheen effect". Post-Two and a Half Men, he starred in the FX sitcom series Anger Management (2012–2014) and the film Machete Kills (2013).

In 2025, he was the subject of the Netflix documentary Aka Charlie Sheen and published a New York Times best-selling memoir, The Book of Sheen, which detailed his career and recovery.

== Early life ==
Carlos Irwin Estévez was born on September 3, 1965, in New York City, the youngest son of actor Martin Sheen (whose real name is Ramón Estévez) and artist Janet Templeton. His paternal grandparents were emigrants from Galicia (Spain) and Ireland, respectively. Sheen said in 2011 that his father was Catholic and his mother was Southern Baptist. He has two older brothers, Emilio and Ramon, and a younger sister, Renée, all actors. His parents moved to Malibu, California, after Martin's Broadway run in The Subject Was Roses. Sheen's first movie appearance was at age nine in his father's 1974 film The Execution of Private Slovik. Sheen attended Santa Monica High School in Santa Monica, California, along with Robert Downey Jr., where he was a star pitcher and shortstop for the baseball team.

At Santa Monica High School, he showed an early interest in acting, making amateur Super 8 films with his brother Emilio and school friends Rob Lowe and Sean Penn under his birth name. A few weeks before his scheduled graduation from Santa Monica High School, Sheen was expelled from school for poor grades and attendance. He then chose to become an actor, and adopted the stage name Charlie Sheen. His father had earlier adopted the surname Sheen in his acting career, in honor of the Catholic archbishop and theologian Fulton J. Sheen, and Charlie was an English form of his given name Carlos.

== Career ==
=== 1983–1999: Breakthrough and stardom ===
Sheen's film career began in 1983, when he was cast to portray Ron in Grizzly II: The Predator, the sequel to the 1976 low-budget horror movie Grizzly, which remained unreleased until 2020. In 1984, he had a role in the John Milius-directed Cold War teen drama Red Dawn with Patrick Swayze, C. Thomas Howell, Lea Thompson, and Jennifer Grey. His next theatrical release was The Boys Next Door (1985), directed by Penelope Spheeris. While largely ignored by the public, the film was critically acclaimed. The Los Angeles Times review praised Sheen, by saying he is "marvelous as a kid scared of his own desires--eyes wide open, paralyzed with fear, he looks like a deer caught in the glare of a hunter's headlights". The New York Times review has also praised Sheen's "exceptionally well-acted" performance and compared the film to Badlands (1973), a film starring Charlie's father Martin Sheen for its "lean and unsentimental" atmosphere.

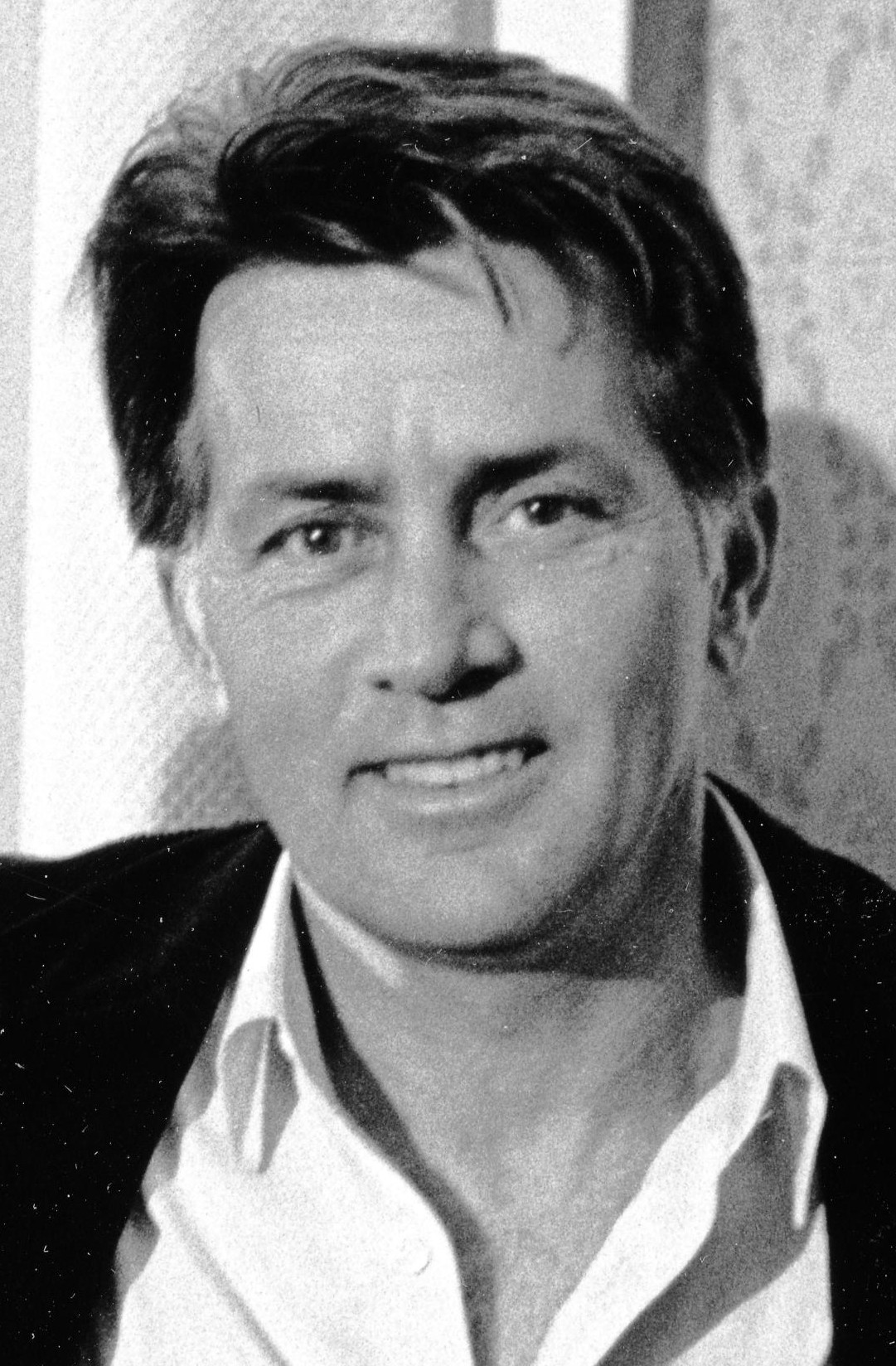
In his early roles, critics favorably compared Charlie Sheen to his father, Martin Sheen, highlighting parallels between Charlie's performances in The Boys Next Door (1985) and Platoon (1986) and Martin's acclaimed roles in Badlands (1973) and Apocalypse Now (1979).

In 1986, Sheen had started to get more attention. He reunited with Jennifer Grey in a small scene in the comedy film Ferris Bueller's Day Off, where he played a juvenile delinquent Grey meets in a police station. Sheen intentionally deprived himself of sleep to have a more authentic look. New York Daily News wrote that Sheen "makes a great impact in this one brief scene [more] than anyone else in the movie." Film critic Gene Siskel praised the chemistry between him and Grey.

Sheen had a supporting role in the coming-of-age drama Lucas (1986), which got a mostly positive reception. Roger Ebert of Chicago Sun-Times said Sheen has the most difficult role to play in Lucas and his performance avoids the clichés usually associated with teen jock characters. Los Angeles Times review has also praised Sheen, writing that he "exudes naturalness, manages to be handsome without being self-conscious" and surprisingly "emerges as the film's most consistently sympathetic figure." He didn't get much attention for the science fiction film The Wraith (1986), despite playing the titular role, because critics thought he was underused. In a review for The Washington Post, critic Paul Attanasio mentioned that "there is all too little of the quietly charismatic Sheen."

Sheen's breakthrough role came in the Oliver Stone-directed Vietnam War drama Platoon (1986). The film was a major commercial and critical success and won four Oscars, including the Academy Award for Best Picture. Sheen and the rest of the cast underwent an immersive military‑style boot camp lasting about 30 days, with strict control over food and water, minimal sleep, and blank‑fire exercises to simulate combat stress. Vincent Canby of The New York Times applauded Sheen's performance, saying the character was "beautifully played." The Arizona Republic described the performance as "terrific" and Newsday as "marvellous." Variety review noted the similarities he has with his father Martin, making a comparison to his father's Apocalypse Now performance. Both Platoon and Ferris Bueller were among the ten highest-grossing films of the year in the United States.

His first post-Platoon role was in the road film Three for the Road (1987), which did not get much attention; Sheen reportedly called it "the nadir" of his career. Despite negative reviews, the critics described Sheen's performance as one of the stronger points of the film. In the same year, he collaborated with Oliver Stone again by starring opposite Michael Douglas and his father Martin Sheen in the drama Wall Street in which he played the role of Bud Fox, a young and ambitious stockbroker. The film received mostly positive reviews and was a commercial success. The Washington Post review raved about his performance: "the younger Sheen, who walked wide-eyed through Stone's Vietnam, walks with similar innocence through [the film] and with his three-piece determination he's perfect as a greenhorn yuppie playing with the big guns." The Hollywood Reporter review found him "commendably convincing". Roger Ebert was more critical, citing Sheen's performance as the film's only flaw as he "never seems quite relentless enough to move in Gekko's circle". However, in the same year, Ebert praised Sheen's performance in the crime drama No Man's Land as "very good" and "charismatic".

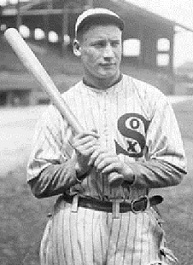
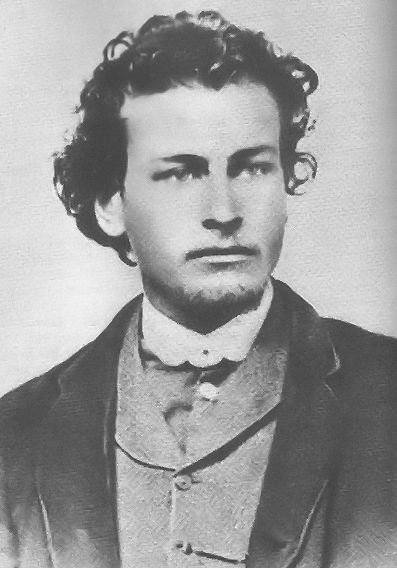
In 1988, Sheen portrayed Happy Felsch (left), a member of the Chicago White Sox involved in the 1919 Black Sox scandal, in Eight Men Out, and Richard M. Brewer (right), a cowboy and leader of Lincoln County Regulators, in Young Guns.

In 1988, Sheen was the part of two ensemble casts, where he played real-life figures. He starred in John Sayles-directed baseball drama film Eight Men Out (1988) as Happy Felsch and opposite his brother Emilio in the western film Young Guns as Richard M. Brewer. In 1989, Sheen, John Fusco, Christopher Cain, Lou Diamond Phillips, Emilio Estévez and Kiefer Sutherland were honored with a Bronze Wrangler for their work on the Young Guns. An avid baseball player since his youth, Sheen has stated that he took the role in the critically acclaimed Eight Men Out not for the money or career but only because of his love for baseball.

He passed on Bull Durham to do another baseball comedy film Major League (1989), a critical and commercial success. Sheen's performance as Ricky "Wild Thing" Vaughn, which he also reprised in the 1994 sequel, is often considered to be among his most-known characters. Common Sense Media praised his comedic ability in the first film, by writing "Sheen shines as the rockin' closer with a lot of attitude." Empire magazine review also highlighted Sheen for being "a delightful surprise at light comedy."

In 1990, he starred alongside his father and brother, in the films directed by them respectively in the drama film Cadence as a rebellious inmate in a military stockade and in the black comedy film Men at Work as a garbageman who finds himself in trouble. In the same year, he had a cameo role in Dennis Hopper's thriller film Catchfire and a starring role with Clint Eastwood in the buddy cop film The Rookie, directed by Eastwood himself. The Rookie and Sheen's performance got mostly negative reviews. Roger Ebert has criticized Sheen for his "low energy and absent-minded performance". Owen Gleiberman from Entertainment Weekly observed: "when Sheen slips over the edge and trashes a bar full of hooligan bikers, his performance suddenly comes to life; he should go psycho more often." He also took on the lead role in another action film Navy SEALs (1990), which got a mostly negative reception. Los Angeles Times review notes that Sheen's portrayal lacks psychological depth, describing his character as a "new-style psychopath" who casually terminates possibly innocent civilians without remorse. Despite this, Sheen's energetic performance adds a layer of gusto to the role. In a retrospective review in 2001, IGN wrote that the role "is one of many which would forever change his reputation from a dedicated actor (see Platoon or Wall Street) to the fun-loving hell raiser image that first springs into our minds today."

Sheen starred in the parody film Hot Shots! (1991) and its sequel, Hot Shots! Part Deux (1993), both huge commercial successes. Film critic Janet Maslin praised Sheen, saying "[he] brings just the right exaggerated seriousness to his ace pilot's role" and Kenneth Turan also praised his comic timing. In an interview with Bobbie Wygant, Sheen stated that for Part Deux, he underwent an intense physical regimen that included a strict diet, yoga, swimming, stationary biking, and general martial arts training. He described the program as an "insane" eight-hour-a-day, six-days-a-week routine that also involved a personal trainer for the first five weeks. Both films were among the highest-grossing films of their respective years. In 1993, he featured in the real-life inspired crime drama Beyond the Law with Linda Fiorentino and Michael Madsen, where he played a disgraced former cop who goes undercover to infiltrate a violent biker gang involved in drug trafficking.

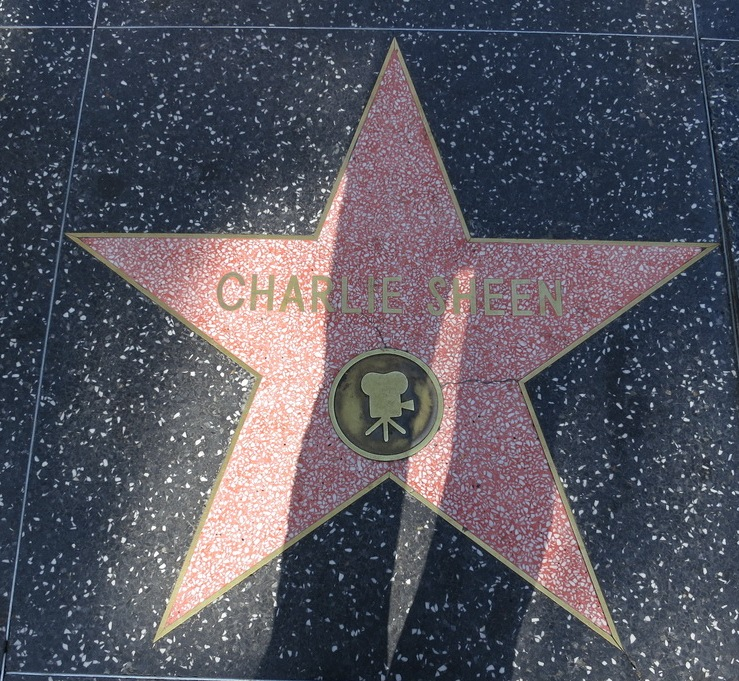
Sheen's star on the Hollywood Walk of Fame

Sheen turned down the roles in the sports comedy White Men Can't Jump (1992) and the drama Indecent Proposal (1993); both roles went to Woody Harrelson. Instead, he began taking more action-oriented roles by the mid-1990s, to mixed reception. He starred as Aramis in the new Disney version of The Three Musketeers (1993). Entertainment Weekly review described him as "reliably dry". The film was a commercial success but his follow-up action roles in The Chase (1994) and Terminal Velocity (1994) were box office flops. Regarding his performance in The Chase, Roger Ebert has praised his "ability to play an almost impossible role in a fairly straight style". Film critic James Berardinelli has also noted his "surprisingly effective chemistry" with co-star Kristy Swanson.

For Terminal Velocity, Sheen received the highest salary of his movie career, earning $6 million. The film got mostly negative reviews, and Sheen's performance garnered mixed comments. Entertainment Weekly review said that despite some "fun" one-liners, Sheen gives "a boringly flat, square-jawed performance"; conversely, Variety felt that "Sheen's glib, sexy persona suits the befuddled but courageous flyboy" and Empire found him "delightful".

In 1996, Sheen has returned to the science fiction genre with the film The Arrival, a box office flop that later gained cult following. The Los Angeles Times review praised Sheen's performance as the paranoid astronomer, calling it the role he was "born to" play. James Berardinelli also praised Sheen's performance and noted that he carried the film "admirably." IGN review was less impressed, finding him "over-the-top". Sheen also made his first sitcom appearance as a guest star in the second season of the popular television series Friends. Despite later becoming a well-known sitcom star, Sheen was so nervous during his first sitcom attempt in front of a live audience that filming had to pause. Nevertheless, Sheen's performance was well received, earning him spots on best guest stars of the show lists by People magazine and Looper.

Sheen next starred in the political thriller Shadow Conspiracy (1997), a commercial and critical failure. Total Film review described the film as Sheen's "latest attempt to send his career to the gas chamber". His next release, the action comedy film Money Talks (1997), co-starring Chris Tucker, received mostly negative reviews but was his last box office success of the decade. Variety wrote that "Sheen, in a considerably less flashy role, gives one of his better performances. He understands he's meant to be the calming influence in this scenario and perfectly effects the slick, slightly vain, low-key demeanor of CNN's Linden Soles". He then began working primarily in the direct-to-video market, often credited as Charles Sheen. His first role under that name was as a firefighter who harasses his neighbors in the thriller Bad Day on the Block (1997), released as Under Pressure in some markets. The A.V. Club praised Sheen and co-star Mare Winningham for delivering "surprisingly textured, multidimensional performances".

Sheen's subsequent Charles roles included the crime comedy Free Money (1998, opposite Marlon Brando in his final leading role), the serial killer thriller Postmortem (1998, directed by Albert Pyun), and the action film No Code of Conduct (1998), the last of which he co-wrote and produced. Sheen returned to theatrical releases by playing a fictional version of himself in the Spike Jonze film Being John Malkovich (1999) in a performance that Roger Ebert described as an "inspired cameo". PopMatters review highlighted Sheen's role as maintaining a "grim sort of reality", especially considering his real-life struggles at the time, which added depth to his performance. As a part of the ensemble cast, he was nominated for the Actor Award for the Outstanding Performance By a Cast.

=== 2000–2011: Sitcom success ===
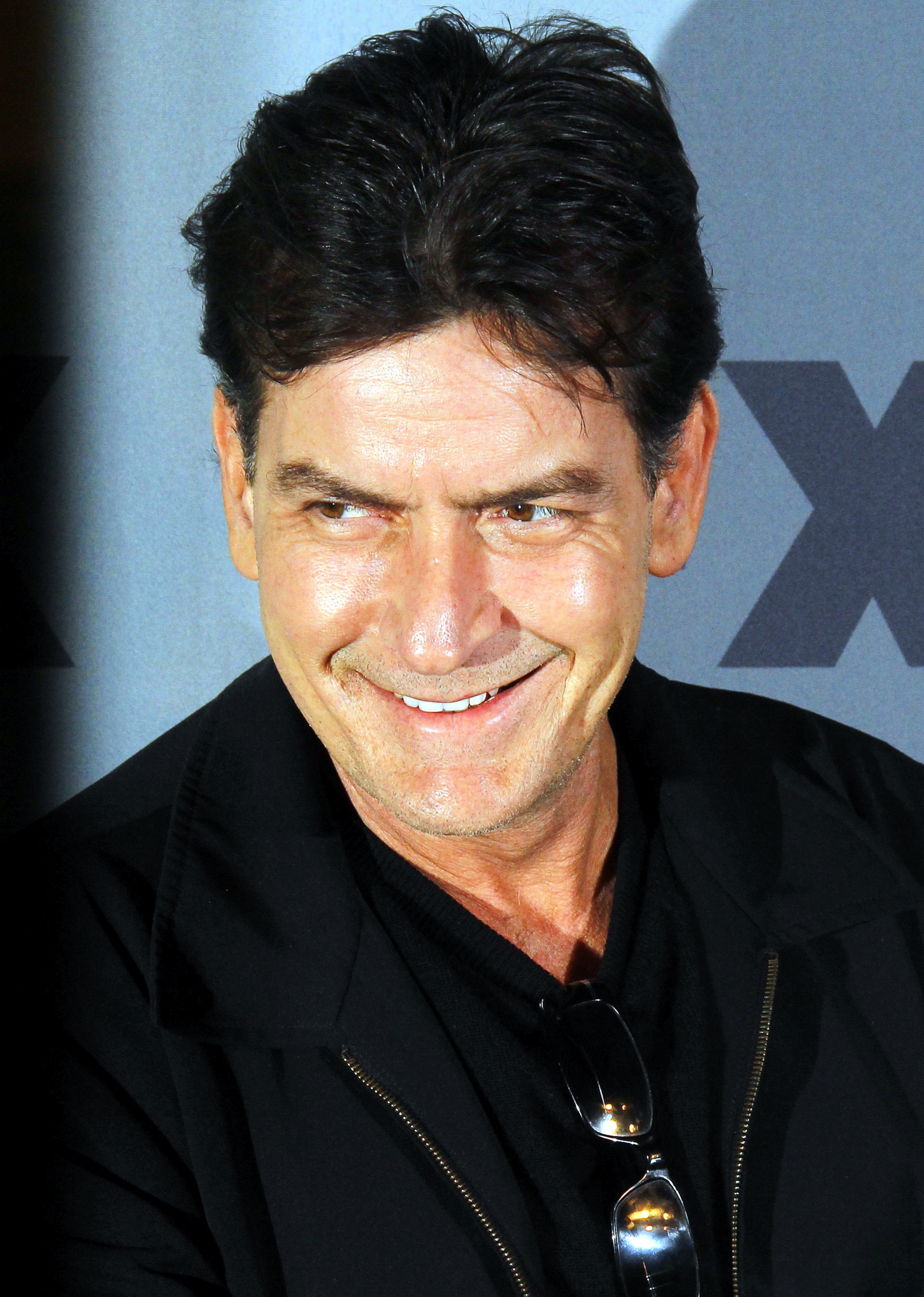
Sheen in 2012

In the new millennium, Sheen has mostly moved to television roles. His first role was the Emilio Estevez-directed Showtime biographical drama film Rated X (2000), in which he and Emilio played pornographic industry entrepreneurs Artie and Jim Mitchell, respectively. Variety review gave high praise to their performances, by writing both actors do "an uncanny, genuinely impressive job". New York Post review raved about their performances as "beyond good".

His first sitcom lead attempt was a pilot for ABC, called Sugar Hill in 1999, which was not picked up. In 2000, Sheen first appeared on the small screen as a series regular when he replaced Michael J. Fox for the last two seasons of the sitcom Spin City. After Sheen joined, the show's ratings improved among younger viewers, especially the 18–34 demographic. Michael J. Fox stated that Sheen did a "great job" as his replacement. For his work on Spin City, Sheen was nominated for two ALMA Awards and won his first Golden Globe for Best Performance by an Actor in a Television Series – Musical or Comedy. The series ended in 2002. He also appeared in Scary Movie 3 (2003), Scary Movie 4 (2006) and Scary Movie 5 (2013) entries in the popular horror-spoof series Scary Movie.

In 2003, Sheen was cast as Charlie Harper in the CBS sitcom Two and a Half Men, which followed the popular Monday night time slot of Everybody Loves Raymond. Sheen's role on Two and a Half Men was loosely based on Sheen's bad-boy image. Sheen's performance was well received. USA Today review wrote "Sheen is so amusingly sardonic and cheerfully self-aware, he makes Charlie's immaturity endearing rather than annoying." The role garnered him an ALMA Award and he gained four Emmy Award nominations and two Golden Globe award nominations. During his eighth and final season on the show, Sheen earned $1.8 million per episode.

==== Warner Bros. dismissal and publicity ====
Production of Two and a Half Men went on hiatus in January 2011 while Sheen underwent a substance rehabilitation program in his home, his third attempt at rehab in 12 months. The following month, CBS canceled the season's four remaining episodes after Sheen publicly made offensive comments about the series' creator, Chuck Lorre, and Warner Bros. Television banned Sheen from entering its production lot. Sheen, already the highest-paid actor on television, responded by publicly demanding a 50-percent raise, claiming that in comparison to the amount that the series was making, he was "underpaid".

CBS and Warner Bros. Television terminated Sheen's contract on March 7, 2011. He was replaced by Ashton Kutcher. In the aftermath of his dismissal, Sheen continued to feud with Chuck Lorre, and filed a wrongful termination lawsuit against Lorre and Warner Bros. Television, which was settled the following September 26. That same month, Sheen, while presenting an award at the Primetime Emmy Awards, addressed "everybody here from Two and a Half Men" and stated, "From the bottom of my heart, I wish you nothing but the best for this upcoming season. We spent eight wonderful years together and I know you will continue to make great television."

In the wake of the dismissal, Sheen had a highly publicized meltdown which was broadcast on television and the Internet. He made claims in television interviews suggesting that he was a "warlock" with "tiger blood" and "Adonis DNA", and that he was "winning". He also posted videos to YouTube showing himself smoking cigarettes through his nose, and cursing out his former employers. He told one television interviewer, "I'm tired of pretending I'm not special. I'm tired of pretending I'm not a total bitchin' rock star from Mars." After being accused of antisemitism in 2011, Sheen claimed that his mother was Jewish, although Jewish Standard reporter Nate Bloom wrote that he found no evidence to support this and described Sheen's claim as "exceedingly unlikely". Sheen said later that year that his father was Catholic and his mother was Southern Baptist.

On September 19, 2011, Sheen was roasted on Comedy Central. It was watched by 6.4 million people, making it the highest-rated roast on Comedy Central to date. Also that year, he played a role in the hip hop music video "Steak & Mash Potatoes" by Chain Swangaz featuring Brother Marquis. The video features both rappers as fast-food employees who create havoc while their boss (Sheen) is gone.

=== 2012–present ===
In 2012, Sheen returned to television in Anger Management, the spin-off of the film of the same name. The series ended after a 100-episode run in the second season in late 2014.

Also in 2012, Sheen was cast to star alongside Jason Schwartzman and Bill Murray in Roman Coppola's surreal comedy film A Glimpse Inside the Mind of Charles Swan III. That same year he voiced Dex Dogtective in the Lionsgate animated comedy Foodfight (2012). For the 2013 film Machete Kills, in which Sheen played the President of the United States, he was credited under his birth name Carlos Estévez. It was a one-time move due to the film's Hispanic theme; it was Sheen's idea to use his birth name for the film. The trailer and opening credits for the film used an "and introducing..." tag when showing Sheen's birth name. Sheen's next feature film project was the ensemble film 9/11 (2017), an adaptation of the 9/11 stage play Elevator written by Patrick Carson. The film also featured Whoopi Goldberg, Gina Gershon, Luis Guzmán, Wood Harris, Jacqueline Bisset, and Bruce Davison. Sheen's performance gained mixed reviews. Film critic Alonso Duralde of TheWrap wrote Sheen now "lacks the vitality he once brought to the screen, but neither does he embarrass himself."

In October 2018, Sheen flew to Australia for his "An Evening with Charlie Sheen" tour. During this time, he filmed an advert for car servicing company Ultra Tune, which was the next installment in their controversial "Unexpected Situations" series alongside Parnia Porsche, Laura Lydall, Tyana Hansen, and Imogen Lovell.

In 2025 a two-part documentary about Sheen titled aka Charlie Sheen was released on Netflix.

== Other ventures ==
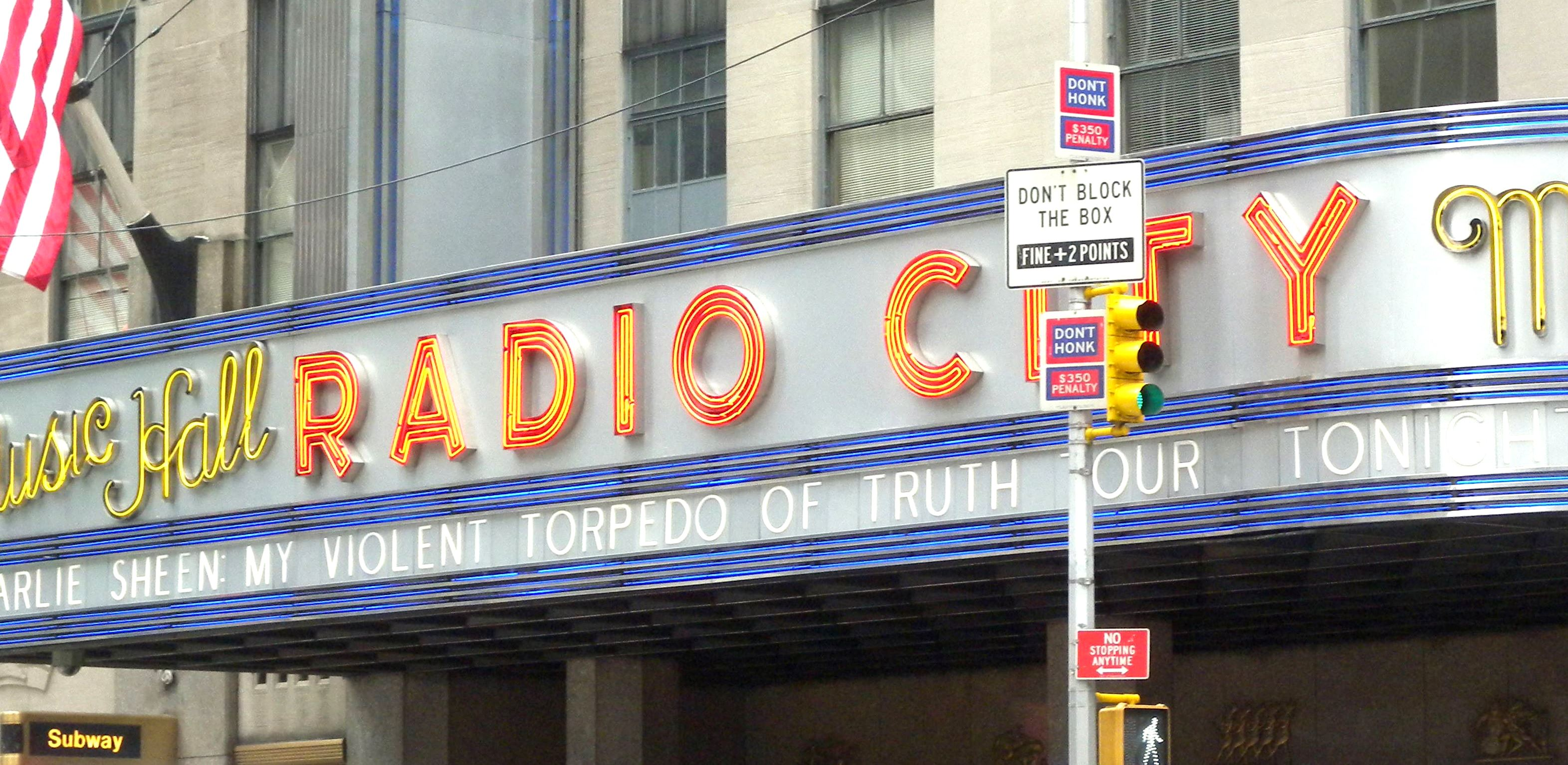
Sheen's "My Violent Torpedo of Truth/Defeat is Not An Option" tour on the marquee of Radio City Music Hall in New York City

In 2006, Sheen launched a clothing line for children, called Sheen Kidz. In 2011, Sheen set a Guinness World Record as the "Fastest Time to Reach 1 Million Followers" on Twitter, adding an average of 129,000 new followers daily, as well as a Guinness record for "Highest Paid TV Actor Per Episode – Current" at $1.25 million while he was a part of the cast of Two and a Half Men sitcom. On March 3, 2011, Sheen signed with Ad.ly marketing agency specializing in Twitter and Facebook promotions.

On March 10, 2011, Sheen announced a nationwide tour, "My Violent Torpedo of Truth/Defeat is Not An Option", which began in Detroit on April 2. The tour sold out in 18 minutes, a Ticketmaster record. However, on April 1, 2011, the Detroit Free Press featured an article that stated as of March 30 that there were over 1000 tickets available from a third-party reseller, some at 15% less than the cheapest seats sold at the Fox Theater. The Huffington Post reported that it was expected Sheen would earn $1 million in 2011 from Twitter endorsements and $7 million from the North American tour. Many of those attending the performance of April 2 in Detroit found it disappointing; the subsequent performance in Chicago, which featured some adjustments, received a more positive reception.

Sheen was announced as the face of and partner in "NicoSheen", a line of disposable E-cigarettes and related products.

On August 13, 2011, Sheen hosted at the 12th annual Gathering of the Juggalos, an event created by the Insane Clown Posse. He received a mixed reaction from the audience, but has expressed appreciation for the culture by describing himself as a Juggalo and wearing a baseball cap featuring the Psychopathic Records logo in public and during production meetings for Anger Management.

== Personal life ==
=== Family and relationships ===
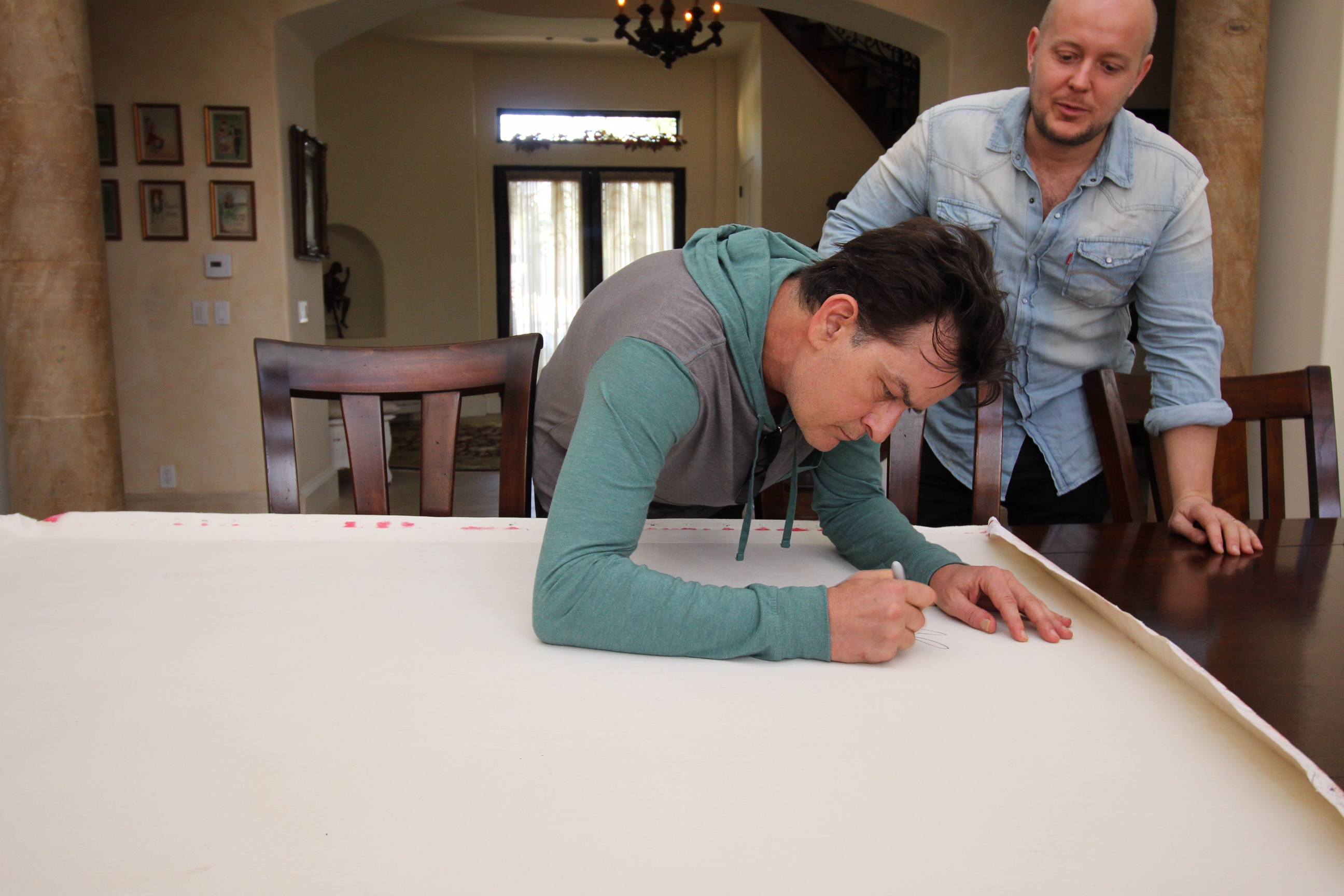
Sheen signing a portrait in 2015

Sheen has been married three times. He has five children and two grandchildren.

His oldest daughter is from a relationship with his former high-school girlfriend, Paula Profit, whose name has also been given as Paula Speert. Through a daughter, Sheen has one granddaughter.

In January 1990, Sheen's fiancée, Kelly Preston, was hit by shrapnel after a gun went off in their house. She broke off the engagement shortly thereafter. Preston always maintained that it was an accident and in 2011, called Sheen "a good person." In the 1990s, Sheen subsequently dated a number of pornographic film actresses, including Ginger Lynn and Heather Hunter.

On September 3, 1995, Sheen married his first wife, model Donna Peele. That same year, Sheen was named as one of the clients of an escort agency operated by Heidi Fleiss. Sheen and Peele divorced in 1996.

Sheen met actress Denise Richards on the set of Good Advice in 2000. They began dating in October 2001, when Richards guest-starred on Sheen's television show Spin City. They became engaged on December 26, 2001, and married on June 15, 2002, at the estate of Spin City creator Gary David Goldberg. They have two daughters together, born in 2004 and 2005. In March 2005, Richards filed for divorce, accusing Sheen of alcohol and drug abuse, being addicted to gambling, hiring prostitutes, making threats of violence towards her, and of looking at gay pornography featuring boys "who looked underage" and being "attracted" to underage girls. Sheen later denied these claims, and stated that the FBI was "aware" of the allegations and had searched his computers. The divorce was finalized in November 2006 and preceded a custody dispute over their two daughters.

On May 30, 2008, Sheen married his third wife, Brooke Mueller. Mueller gave birth to their twin sons on March 14, 2009. In November 2010, Sheen filed for divorce. On March 1, 2011, police removed the couple's sons from Sheen's home. Sheen told NBC's Today, "I stayed very calm and focused." According to People, social services took the children after Mueller obtained a restraining order against Sheen. The document said, "I am very concerned that [Sheen] is currently insane." Asked if he would fight for the children, Sheen texted People, "Born ready. Winning." Sheen and Mueller's divorce became final on May 2, 2011.

On March 1, 2011, Sheen was concurrently living with 24-year-old pornographic actress Bree Olson and 24-year-old model and graphic designer Natalie Kenly, whom he collectively nicknamed his "goddesses". Olson left Sheen in April 2011, and Kenly left in June 2011. In a January 2013 interview on Piers Morgan Tonight, Sheen stated that he was in a relationship with adult film actress and 2011 Penthouse magazine "Pet of the Month" Georgia Jones.

In February 2014, Sheen became engaged to former adult film star Brett Rossi, who began going by her real name, Scottine. With a wedding planned for November 2014, the engagement was broken off in October with an announcement that the two had "mutually decided" to separate. Sheen stated, "I've decided that my children deserve my focus more than a relationship does right now. I still have a tremendous fondness for Scotty and I wish her all the best." A month later it was reported that Rossi was hospitalized for an apparent drug overdose. In 2015, Rossi sued Sheen after his announcement of being HIV-positive, alleging that he hid this information from her during their relationship, and for other allegations including "assault and battery, emotional distress, false imprisonment and negligence". The suit was referred to arbitration. Another girlfriend of Sheen sued him in 2017, claiming that in 2015 he had concealed his HIV-positive status from her until after they had unprotected sex. The lawsuit was settled in 2022, with Sheen paying $120,000 to the woman. Sheen addressed the allegations in the documentary aka Charlie Sheen (2025), reaffirming that he never transmitted HIV to another person.

In June 2022, Sheen's second daughter created an OnlyFans account. Sheen initially disapproved of the action. He later changed his mind, citing points made by her mother.

In September 2025, while promoting his autobiography The Book of Sheen to People magazine, Sheen revealed he has had sexual encounters with several men, saying that "I'm no longer running from anything. I wanted to try something new." Sheen also claims full responsibility for his actions, and he also follows that with "So what?"

=== Residences ===
For many years, Sheen resided in Beverly Hills, California. He sold his property for $6.6 million in 2020. As of 2022, Sheen resides in a rented house in Malibu, California.

Sheen has also owned properties in Agoura Hills, Sherman Oaks and Cabo San Lucas, Mexico.

=== Substance abuse and health ===
On May 20, 1998, Sheen had a stroke after overdosing while using cocaine and was hospitalized. Sheen was found in his seaside home by a friend, after which paramedics rushed him to Los Robles Hospital & Medical Center in Thousand Oaks, California, where he was described as being in "serious condition" after his stomach was pumped. Days later, Sheen checked into a rehab clinic, then told doctors that he did not intend to stay. Sheen left, but sheriff's deputies forced Sheen back to the clinic. On August 11, 1998, Sheen, already on probation in California for a battery offense, had his probation extended by one year and entered a rehab clinic. In a 2004 interview, Sheen disclosed that his previous overdose was caused by injecting cocaine.

On November 17, 2015, Sheen publicly revealed that he was HIV-positive, having been diagnosed roughly four years earlier. In an interview, he referred to the acronym HIV as "three hard letters to absorb," while clarifying that his 2011 meltdown was not a response to the diagnosis, as it came afterwards. He manages his condition with a triple cocktail of antiretroviral drugs, and said that it was impossible that he could have knowingly infected any of his partners. Sheen noted that since 2011, he had paid extortionists approximately $10 million to keep his HIV status secret. Sheen stated that he was upfront about his HIV-positive condition with all of his past partners.

=== Legal issues ===
In 1997, Sheen was charged with battering his then-girlfriend Brittany Ashland. After pleading no-contest, he was sentenced to two years of probation, plus a suspended jail sentence of one year and $2,800 of fines.

On December 25, 2009, Sheen was arrested for assaulting his wife, Brooke Mueller, in Aspen, Colorado. He was released the same day from jail after posting an $8,500 bond. Sheen was charged with felony menacing, as well as third-degree assault and criminal mischief. On August 2, 2010, Sheen, represented by Yale Galanter, pleaded guilty to misdemeanor assault as part of a plea bargain that included dismissal of the other charges against him. Sheen was sentenced to 30 days in a drug rehab center, 30 days of probation, and 36 hours of anger management.

On October 26, 2010, the police removed Sheen from his suite at the Plaza Hotel after he reportedly caused $7,000 in damage. According to the NYPD, Sheen admitted to drinking and using cocaine the night of the incident.

In April 2016, Sheen had his monthly child support payments to his two ex-wives, Richards and Mueller, reduced from $55,000 to $10,000. The same month, it was announced that Sheen was under investigation by the LAPD stalking unit for threatening to kill his former fiancée Scottine Ross.

=== Feldman allegation ===
In 2017, Sheen sued the National Enquirer over a story alleging that, in 1986, he raped his 13-year-old co-star Corey Haim on the set of Lucas. The case was settled in 2018. Haim's mother, Judy Haim, identified a different actor as her son's rapist on The Dr. Oz Show, and told Entertainment Tonight that Sheen never raped her son, calling the claims "made up".

In March 2020, actor Corey Feldman repeated the claim that Sheen raped Haim in his documentary (My) Truth: The Rape of Two Coreys, corroborated by Feldman's ex-wife Susie Feldman and his Lost Boys co-star Jamison Newlander. Sheen, through his publicist, denied the allegations, calling them "sick, twisted and outlandish". Corey Haim's sister Cari Haim has criticized the documentary and supported Sheen's side.

In 2025 while promoting his book The Book of Sheen and during an interview with Entertainment Tonight, Sheen himself also denied the allegations, calling it "bullshit", "a vile work of fiction", and a hideous insult to the memory of Haim. Sheen later said "shame on Feldman." In his documentary aka Charlie Sheen, Sheen addresses the allegations and stated that he considered suing Feldman, who has been accused of sexual misconduct by multiple women since then, but ultimately chose not to, saying he did not want to give him "more content." In a 2025 documentary Corey Feldman vs. The World, Feldman further alleged that he was sexually abused by Haim, stating that Haim claimed Sheen had told him such behavior was acceptable. Feldman later retracted this allegation.

=== Political views ===
In a 2015 interview, Sheen described himself as a "constitutional Republican" and expressed a desire to run for president in 2016. Despite having been an active critic of the Bush administration at the time it was in power, Sheen spoke fondly of George W. Bush in 2014, saying: "He did the best he could with what he was confronted with, and it is beyond anything I can comprehend".

Sheen has been publicly scathing about President Donald Trump. In 2016, he labeled Trump a "charlatan" and wished death upon him. However, in a 2025 appearance on The Megyn Kelly Show during her live tour, Sheen stated that he voted for Kamala Harris in the 2024 United States presidential election, but more recently has "been listening to both sides", praised some of Trump's policy, including his negotiated agreements in international conflicts and said he had to "part ways" with the Democratic Party.

Despite being a gun enthusiast in his youth, Sheen has spoken in favor of gun control. In 2013, while discussing the Sandy Hook Elementary School shooting, he commented, "If anybody from the NRA wants to look any of those parents in the eyes from that school and tell them that guns are still necessary, then I urge them to, and see how that goes," and added that, "we're not supposed to bury our children."

Sheen is an outspoken advocate of the 9/11 truth movement. On September 8, 2009, he appealed to President Barack Obama to set up a new investigation into the attacks. Presenting his views as a transcript of a fictional encounter with Obama, he was characterized by the press as believing the 9/11 Commission was a whitewash and that the George W. Bush administration may have been responsible for the attacks.

Sheen is staunchly opposed to vaccinations. After separating from Denise Richards, he sent a legal notice to his daughters' physician stating his lack of consent to vaccinate them. The dispute over vaccines seems to have played an important role in the failure of the marriage. Richards said in an interview in 2008, "When I vaccinated Sam, he accused me of poisoning her. And I knew when he said that that the marriage wasn't going to work."

== Activism ==
=== The Charlie Sheen effect ===
Sheen's disclosure of his HIV-positive diagnosis corresponded with the greatest number of HIV-related Google searches ever recorded in the United States. During the three weeks following his disclosure, there were about 2.75 million more searches than expected that included the term HIV, and 1.25 million searches were directly relevant to public-health outcomes because they included search terms for condoms, HIV symptoms, or HIV testing (e.g., "get HIV tested").

A 2017 study found that Sheen's disclosure corresponded with a 95% increase in over-the-counter at-home HIV testing kits.

The study's authors dubbed it "The Charlie Sheen Effect", with commenters noting "Charlie Sheen did more for HIV education than most UN events do." Sheen spoke out for HIV prevention, sharing the studies on social media, tweeting "Honored, humbled, inspired, hopeful."

=== Charity work ===
Sheen was the 2004 spokesperson for the Lee National Denim Day breast cancer fundraiser that raised millions of dollars for research and education regarding the disease. Sheen stated that a friend of his died from breast cancer, and he wanted to try to help find a cure for the disease.

A major donor and supporter of Aid For AIDS since 2006, Sheen was honored with an AFA Angel Award, one of only a few ever given, at the nonprofit's 25th Silver Anniversary Reception in 2009. In addition to his financial support, he has volunteered to act as a celebrity judge for several years for their annual fundraiser, Best in Drag Show, which raises around a quarter of a million dollars each year in Los Angeles for AIDS assistance. He has brought other celebrities to support the event, including his father, actor Martin Sheen. Sheen's interest in AIDS was first reported in 1987 with his support of Ryan White, an Indiana teenager who became a national spokesperson for AIDS awareness after being infected with AIDS through a blood transfusion for his hemophilia.

On March 27, 2008, Sheen and Jenna Elfman co-hosted the Scientology-affiliated New York Rescue Workers Detoxification Project charity event.

Sheen donated one dollar from each ticket sold from his "My Violent Torpedo of Truth/Defeat is Not An Option Show" 2011 tour to the Red Cross Japanese earthquake Relief Fund.

In 2011, Sheen took on a Twitter challenge by a grieving mother to help critically ill babies born with congenital diaphragmatic hernia by supporting the Association of Congenital Diaphragmatic Hernia Research, Awareness and Support (CDHRAS).

Sheen is a huge baseball fan, and has attended games in numerous ballparks. Along the way he became good friends with Todd Zeile, despite the latter being neither a partier nor a drinker. The two have traveled widely together, and have collaborated on Hollywood projects.

Sheen is a lifelong fan of the Cincinnati Reds. In August 2012, he announced that he would donate $50,000 to the team's community fund, which supports various charities. The donation came after the team raised another $50,000 in an attempt to get sportscaster Marty Brennaman to shave his head on the field after a Reds victory. After Brennaman shaved his head, Sheen offered to match the previous donation total.

== Filmography ==
=== Film ===
Year	Film	Role	Notes
1973	Badlands	Boy under lamppost	Uncredited
1979	Apocalypse Now	Extra	Uncredited
1983	Grizzly II: Revenge	Lance	Released in 2020
1984	Red Dawn	Matt Eckert	First theatrical release with a credited role
1985	The Boys Next Door	Bo Richards	
1986	A Life in the Day		Short film
1986	Lucas	Cappie Roew	
1986	Ferris Bueller's Day Off	Garth Volbeck	
1986	Platoon	Private Chris Taylor	
1986	The Wraith	Jake Kesey	
1986	Wisdom	Hamburger restaurant manager	Cameo
1987	Wall Street	Bud Fox	
1987	No Man's Land	Ted Varrick	
1987	Three for the Road	Paul	
1988	Eight Men Out	Oscar "Happy" Felsch	
1988	Young Guns	Richard "Dick" Brewer	
1989	Tale of Two Sisters	Narrator	Also writer
1989	Major League	Ricky "Wild Thing" Vaughn	
1989	Never on Tuesday	Thief	Uncredited cameo
1990	Cadence	Private First Class Franklin Fairchild Bean	
1990	Courage Mountain	Peter	
1990	Catchfire	Bob	Cameo
1990	Men at Work	Carl Taylor	
1990	Navy SEALs	Lieutenant Dale Hawkins	
1990	The Rookie	David Ackerman	
1991	Hot Shots!	Lieutenant Sean Topper Harley	
1993	Beyond the Law	Dan Saxon	
1993	Loaded Weapon 1	Gern	Cameo
1993	Hot Shots! Part Deux	Lieutenant Sean Topper Harley	
1993	Deadfall	Morgan "Fats" Gripp	
1993	The Three Musketeers	Aramis	
1994	Terminal Velocity	Richard "Ditch" Brodie	
1994	The Chase	Jackson Davis "Jack" Hammond	Also executive producer
1994	Major League II	Ricky "Wild Thing" Vaughn	
1996	Loose Women	Barbie-loving bartender	Cameo
1996	All Dogs Go to Heaven 2	Charles B. "Charlie" Barkin	Voice
1996	The Arrival	Zane Zaminsky	
1997	Money Talks	James Russell	
1997	Shadow Conspiracy	Bobby Bishop	
1997	Bad Day on the Block	Lyle Wilder	
1997	Discovery Mars	Narrator	Short documentary
1998	Postmortem	James McGregor	
1998	A Letter from Death Row	Cop	Cameo
1998	No Code of Conduct	Jacob "Jake" Peterson	Also executive producer and writer
1998	Free Money	Bud Dyerson	
1998	Junket Whore	Himself	Documentary
1999	Lisa Picard Is Famous	Himself	Cameo
1999	Five Aces	Chris Martin	
1999	Being John Malkovich	Himself	
2001	Good Advice	Ryan Edward Turner	
2001	Last Party 2000	Himself	Documentary
2002	The Making of Bret Michaels	Himself	Documentary
2003	Scary Movie 3	Tom Logan	
2004	The Big Bounce	Bob Rogers Jr.	
2004	Pauly Shore Is Dead	Himself	Cameo
2005	Guilty Hearts	Himself	Segment: "Spelling Bee"
2006	Scary Movie 4	Tom Logan	Uncredited cameo
2010	Wall Street: Money Never Sleeps	Bud Fox	Uncredited cameo
2010	Due Date	Himself/Charlie Harper	Cameo
2011	9/11 Truth: Hollywood Speaks Up	Himself	Documentary
2012	Madea's Witness Protection	Himself	Cameo
2012	A Glimpse Inside the Mind of Charles Swan III	Charles Swan III	
2012	She Wants Me	Himself	Also executive producer
2012	Foodfight!	Dex Dogtective	Voice
2013	Scary Movie 5	Charlie Sanders	Cameo
2013	Machete Kills	President Rathcock	Credited as "Carlos Estevez"
2017	Mad Families	Charlie Jones	
2017	9/11	Jeffrey Cage	

=== Television ===
Year	Film	Role	Notes
1974	The Execution of Private Slovik	Kid at wedding	Television film
1984	Silence of the Heart	Ken Cruze	Television film
1985	The Fourth Wise Man	Captain of Herod's soldiers	Television film
1985	Out of the Darkness	Man shaving	Television film
1986	Amazing Stories: Book Three	Casey	Episode: "No Day at the Beach"
1994	Charlie Sheen's Stunts Spectacular	Himself	Host; Television documentary
1996	Friends	Ryan	Episode: "The One with the Chicken Pox"
1999	Sugar Hill	Matt Conroy	Unaired sitcom pilot
2000	Rated X	Artie Jay "Art" Mitchell	Television film
2000–2002	Spin City	Charlie Crawford	45 episodes
2001	Saturday Night Live	Himself	Host; Episode: "Charlie Sheen/Nelly Furtado"
2003–2011	Two and a Half Men	Charlie Harper	177 episodes
2006	Overhaulin'	Himself	Episode: "LeMama's Boy"
2008	The Big Bang Theory	Himself	Episode: "The Griffin Equivalency"
2008	CSI: Crime Scene Investigation	Himself	Uncredited; Episode: "Two and a Half Deaths"
2010	Family Guy	Himself	Voice; Episode: "Brian Griffin's House of Payne"
2011	Comedy Central Roast	Himself	Roastee; Television special
2012–2014	Anger Management	Charlie Goodson	100 episodes
2015	The Goldbergs	Garth Volbeck	Episode: "Barry Goldberg's Day Off"
2017	Typical Rick	Broken Family Producer/Mental Clerk	2 episodes
2023–2024	Bookie	Himself	3 episodes
2025	aka Charlie Sheen	Himself	Documentary
2027	Happy Jack	Jack	Lead Role

=== Music videos ===
Year	Video	Artist	Role	Notes
2018	"Drug Addicts"	Lil Pump	Co-doctor	Starring role

== Awards and nominations ==
Sheen has received numerous accolades including a Golden Globe Award for Best Actor – Television Series Musical or Comedy for Spin City in 2002. He was Golden Globe-nominated for Two and a Half Men in 2005 and 2006. He was nominated for the Primetime Emmy Award for Outstanding Lead Actor in a Comedy Series for Two and a Half Men from 2006 to 2009. He also received nominations for three Actor Awards, a Nickelodeon Kids' Choice Awards, four People's Choice Awards, and three Teen Choice Awards. He received a star on the Hollywood Walk of Fame in 1994.

== Books ==
- Sheen, Charlie (September 9, 2025). The Book of Sheen: A Memoir (First hardcover ed.). New York: Gallery Books. ISBN 978-1668075289. OCLC 1526038154.
