= Beverly Hills Brats =

1989 film by Jim Sotos

- Beverly Hills Brats DVD cover
- Directed by: Jim Sotos
- Written by: Terry Moore; Jerry Rivers; Linda Silverthorn
- Produced by: Terry Moore; Jerry Rivers
- Starring: Burt Young; Martin Sheen; Terry Moore; Peter Billingsley; Fernando Allende; George Kirby; Cathy Podewell; Joe Santos; Tonya Townsend; Ramon Sheen
- Cinematography: Harry Mathias
- Edited by: Jerry P. Frizell
- Music by: Barry Goldberg
- Distributed by: Taurus Entertainment Company
- Release date: October 6, 1989
- Running time: 90 minutes
- Country: United States
- Language: English

Beverly Hills Brats is a 1989 American comedy film. Directed by Jim Sotos, the film stars Peter Billingsley, Martin Sheen, Burt Young, Terry Moore, George Kirby, Ruby Keeler (in her final film) and Whoopi Goldberg in a cameo role.

== Plot ==
Scooter is a teen from a wealthy Beverly Hills family. After his plastic surgeon father remarries, Scooter is virtually ignored by his father and stepmother, and treated badly by his two other spoiled siblings, Sterling and Tiffany. Scooter devises a plan to fake his own kidnapping to get his parents' attention and enlists the help of two bumbling crooks, Clive and Elmo. After Scooter is "kidnapped" and a ransom is demanded, he quickly realizes that his plan failed to work and his parents don't miss him.

== Cast ==
- Burt Young as Clive
- Martin Sheen as Dr. Jeffery Miller
- Terry Moore as Veronica
- Peter Billingsley as Scooter
- Fernando Allende as Roberto
- George Kirby as Elmo
- Cathy Podewell as Tiffany
- Joe Santos as Spyder
- Natalie Schafer as Lillian
- Robert Tessier as Slick
- Tonya Townsend as Tulip
- Ramon Sheen as Sterling
- Whoopi Goldberg as herself
- Ruby Keeler as Goldie
- Anna Lee as Gertie
- James Randolph as Reverend
- Pat Renella as Lt. Gofield
- Vito Scotti as Jerry
- Cort McCown as Bart
- Duncan Bravo as Manny
- Jimmy Justice as Deacon
- Aron Eisenberg as Simon
- Michael J Aronin as the Cop

== Reception ==
According to a review at TV guide, "Martin Sheen is reported to have said that he got involved with BEVERLY HILLS BRATS mainly to prove that he could do comedy, and--though the film itself is a comedy in intent only--neither he nor his son Ramon does a bad job here. But the cast is done in by a feeble script. The film has the ingredients for a sharp, corrosive farce, but to do so, it also needed a sharp, corrosive sensibility behind the camera." Leonard Maltin described the film as an "(a)nnoying, pretentious so-called satire". The Motion Picture Annual found: "is merely a movie made in Beverly Hills for people who live in Beverly Hills" and that "this relentlessly unfunny comedy that wastes the talents of some of Hollywood's better character actors (without whom it) probably would not have seen the light of day."
