= The Way (2010 film) =

Drama film directed by Emilio Estevez

- Film Poster
- Directed by: Emilio Estevez
- Written by: Emilio Estevez
- Produced by: David Alexanian; Emilio Estevez
- Starring: Martin Sheen; Deborah Kara Unger; James Nesbitt; Yorick van Wageningen; Emilio Estevez; Ángela Molina
- Cinematography: Juan Miguel Azpiroz
- Edited by: Raúl Dávalos
- Music by: Tyler Bates
- Production companies: Filmax; Elixir Films
- Distributed by: Icon Entertainment International (World-wide); Producers Distribution Agency (United States); Alta Films (Spain)
- Release dates: November 19, 2010 (Spain); September 10, 2010 (TIFF); October 7, 2011 (US); May 16, 2023 (US)
- Running time: 123 minutes
- Countries: United States; Spain
- Language: English
- Box office: $13.9 million (theatrical) $7,3 million (home market)

The Way is a 2010 drama film directed, produced and written by Emilio Estevez, who stars alongside his father Martin Sheen. Deborah Kara Unger, James Nesbitt, and Yorick van Wageningen also star in the film. In it, Martin Sheen's character walks the Camino de Santiago, a traditional pilgrimage route in France, Portugal and Spain.

== Plot ==
Thomas Avery is an American ophthalmologist from Ventura, California, who goes to France following the death of his estranged adult son, Daniel, killed in the Pyrenees during a storm while walking the Camino de Santiago (the Way of St. James), a Christian pilgrimage route to the Cathedral of Santiago de Compostela in Galicia, Spain. Tom's purpose is initially to retrieve his son's body. However, in a combination of grief and homage to his son, Tom decides to walk the ancient spiritual trail where his son died, taking Daniel's ashes with him.

While walking the Camino, Tom meets other people, all looking for greater meaning in their lives. He reluctantly falls in with three other pilgrims in particular. Joost is an overweight man from Amsterdam who says he is walking the route to lose weight to get ready for his brother's wedding and also so that his wife will desire him again. He is a friendly extrovert who is the first to start walking with Tom. Sarah is a Canadian fleeing an abusive husband, who says she is walking the pilgrimage to quit smoking. Jack is an Irish travel writer who when younger had desires to be a great author like William Butler Yeats or James Joyce but never wrote the novel he dreamed of. He is the last to join the quartet and has been suffering from "writer's block". As the pilgrims travel the Camino, they occasionally meet and talk with other pilgrims—two Frenchmen, a young Italian, and Father Frank, an elderly priest from New York. Tom occasionally has visions of Daniel alive and smiling among other people. Tom starts out the journey being cold to his fellow pilgrims, but over the course of their journey he eventually opens up to them.

On the pilgrimage, the group experiences challenges, such as when a young Romani steals Tom's backpack containing his son's ashes. Although the thief escapes, his father drags him back to Tom to return the pack, with embarrassed apologies and an offer in compensation to attend a Romani street party in the evening.

After the group arrives at Santiago de Compostela, Tom is ultimately accompanied to Muxía by the other three members. There, he scatters the remainder of Daniel's ashes in the Atlantic Ocean.

With Daniel's backpack on his back, Tom is shown happily setting out on another journey, this time in Morocco.

== Cast ==
- Martin Sheen as Thomas Avery
- Deborah Kara Unger as Sarah Marie Sinclair
- James Nesbitt as Jack Emerson Stanton
- Yorick van Wageningen as Joost Michael de Witt
- Emilio Estevez as Daniel Avery
- Tchéky Karyo as Captain Henri Sébastien
- Matt Clark as Father Frank
- Renée Estevez as Doreen

== Production ==
=== Development ===
The film was inspired by Emilio Estevez's son, Taylor, who in 2003, then 19 years-old, drove the pilgrimage route with his grandfather, Martin Sheen, then on hiatus from The West Wing. Taylor, who served as an associate producer on the film, met the woman who would become his wife while on the route. After the trip, Sheen and his son began discussing the possibility of a film based on the Camino de Santiago. Sheen originally suggested it be a low-budget documentary, but Estevez was not interested in such a small project, wanting instead a bigger experience.

Estevez also found inspiration in his vineyard, Casa Dumetz, where he wrote much of the dialogue for the film. Exploring the themes of loss, community, and faith, he saw parallels with the characters of the film The Wizard of Oz (1939). The script took six months to get a first draft.

The story is also based on selected stories from Jack Hitt's book Off the Road: A Modern-Day Walk Down the Pilgrim's Route into Spain (1994).

=== Casting ===
Sheen originally suggested Michael Douglas or Mel Gibson for the lead role, but Estevez had written the main character's role specifically for his father. Aside from the main actors, those seen on-screen are real pilgrims from all over the world. One episode in the film involves a group of actual Romani people from Burgos.

=== Filming ===
Filming started on 21 September 2009 and took 40 days. The production company and actors walked between 300 and 350 kilometers during filming. Estevez had a very small crew and shot with available light; night-time sequences were filmed by candle and firelight. Considering the Camino is special to local people on the route, the filmmakers felt great pressure to get the details right.

According to a Christian Broadcasting Network interview, a key scene almost did not happen. With church leadership opposed to allowing the crew to shoot inside the famous cathedral in Santiago de Compostela, Estevez says he took a leap of faith and asked everyone on set to pray for access. "And it worked", claimed Sheen. The crew was given permission just 48 hours before they were scheduled to shoot the scenes, which they felt were critical to the film.

== Release ==
=== Theatrical releases ===
The Way was marketed largely via a word-of-mouth campaign. "We don’t have a lot of money to do a big $40 million P. & A.", Estevez said, talking about his marketing print-and-advertising budget.

The Way was presented in September 2010 at the 2010 Toronto International Film Festival, then first commercially released in Spain on 19 November 2010. The Maltese premiere on February 28, 2011 benefited a tiny Maltese organization, the Pope John XXIII Peace Lab of Ħal Far, which provides shelter to asylum seekers. The shelter, established in 1971, had not sought the funding.

The film was released in the United Kingdom on May 13, 2011 and in the United States on October 7, 2011. Estevez and Sheen took a promotional bus tour in promotion of the film across the United States and through some parts of Canada.

The film was not theatrically released in France until September 25, 2013.

=== Home media ===
The film was released on DVD & Blu-ray on February 21, 2012.

== Rerelease ==
The Way was theatrically re-released in the U.S. in over 800 theaters on May 16, 2023. While promoting the rerelease throughout the country, following the film, Rick Steves interviewed both Estevez and Sheen who discussed the making of the film.

== Reception ==
=== Box office ===
The film took in $110,418 in its U.S. opening weekend; as of February 2012, it had made $4,430,765 in the US, and $7,451,541 in other countries.

Ultimately, the theatrical performance reached a gross of $13,916,152 and the home market performance an additional gross of $7,281,803, thus the film reached a total gross of $21,197,955.

=== Critical reception ===
The film has received a rating of 82% on the review aggregator website Rotten Tomatoes based on a sample of 95 reviews, with an average score of 6.6/10. The consensus description is: "It may be a little too deliberately paced for more impatient viewers, but The Way is a worthy effort from writer/director Emilio Estevez, balancing heartfelt emotion with clear-eyed drama that resists cheap sentiment." Metacritic, which uses a weighted average, assigned the film a score of 64 out of 100 based on 28 critics.

Peter Travers of Rolling Stone magazine gave the film three out of four, while Andrew Schenker of Slant Magazine gave it one out of four. Eric Kohn of IndieWire gave the film a "B+" rating, commenting that "Estevez's narrative is dominated by master shots of the landscape capturing Tom and his pals wandering through the wilderness and small villages, exploring ancient cathedrals and local traditions." Kirk Honeycutt of The Hollywood Reporter wrote a mixed review, stating: "Emilio Estevez's The Way is an earnest film, its heart always in the right place, but it's severely under dramatized." Sheri Linden of Los Angeles Times noted that The Way is more low-key, cohesive, and personal than Estevez's preceding film Bobby.

== Planned sequel ==
After trying for two years, Estevez regained the rights to The Way in 2023 and arranged for a rerelease of the film across the US on May 16, 2023, on about 800 screens through Fathom Events. This led to starting on a new related project as Sheen and Estevez "[had] been talking about doing a follow up, a sequel of sorts". Sheen said he was "up for it" and Estevez said he had come up with the idea of "what it would be".

In February 2024, it was announced that The Way: Chapter 2 was in pre-production with Estevez writing and directing. The film will be produced by E2 Films and distributed worldwide by Goodfellas. The plot is set a decade later and involves Tom, now a surgeon working for Doctors Without Borders in Nigeria, receiving a copy of Jack's bestselling book about their experiences, in which a disturbing secret is revealed. Enraged, Tom seeks out Jack and reunites with Joost as they journey through Amsterdam, Dublin, Brussels and France before returning to Spain and the Camino.
