= Jozo Zovko =

Franciscan priest

The Reverend Jozo Zovko O.F.M.
- Born: 19 March 1941 (age 85); Uzarići, Široki Brijeg, Yugoslavia
- Occupation: Priest
- Religion: Catholic
- Church: Catholic Church
- Ordained: 3 April 1965

Jozo Zovko, OFM (born 19 March 1941) is a Herzegovinian Croat Franciscan priest, most notable for being a parish priest in Medjugorje during the alleged apparitions of the Virgin Mary in 1981. He was very active in the promotion of apparitions around the world. He is an adherent of the Catholic Charismatic Renewal. Zovko is currently under a suspension imposed on him by his bishops in 1989, 1994 and 2004 for disobedience and is forbidden to perform priestly duties in his home Diocese of Mostar-Duvno.

Zovko was ordained a priest as a Franciscan in 1965. During the alleged Marian apparitions in Medjugorje in 1981, he was the parish priest of the St. James Church and became the first supporter and mentor of the visionaries.

The same year he was sentenced to three years in prison because of a sermon allegedly criticising the communist authorities, which Zovko denied. After being released in 1983, he became a vicar in Tihaljina near Grude, but remained in close touch with Medjugorje. It is claimed by the visionaries of Our Lady of Medjugorje, that the Virgin gave them a vision of Zovko while in prison in October 1981. Zovko claims to have had a vision of Our Lady in April 1983.

The Bishop revoked his priestly jurisdiction because of disobedience and his activity in Medjugorje, a decree soon afterward confirmed by Rome in 1989. However, Zovko continued to be active in Medjugorje and around the world, promoting the apparitions, despite the suspension. He finally submitted to the decree under pressure from Rome, and moved to a Franciscan friary in Badija near Korčula in Croatia in 2009, and periodically lived in Graz, Austria, until he moved permanently to Zagreb, Croatia's capital in 2011, where he currently lives.

== Biography ==
Jozo Zovko was born March 1941 in Uzarići, Herzegovina and attended and finished elementary school in nearby Široki Brijeg. He entered the seminary in Bol on the island of Brač in 1958. In 1963 in Sarajevo he began his theology studies and then transferred and graduated from Ljubljana. He was ordained a priest, as a member of the Herzegovinian Franciscan Province, on 3 April 1965. He started taking courses in religious education in 1974 at the University of Gratz. After these studies, he moved to Posušje and became the parish priest. In November 1980, Zovko was appointed parish priest of the St. James Church in Medjugorje. When the visions began on June 24, 1981, he was suspicious at first, of the Marian apparitions, but soon became a fierce supporter. The Madonna allegedly appeared to him as well. He was known to his colleagues to practice special devotions to the Madonna and often participated in catechetical summer schools as a lecturer and discussant of charismatic orientation.

== Marian apparitions in Medjugorje ==
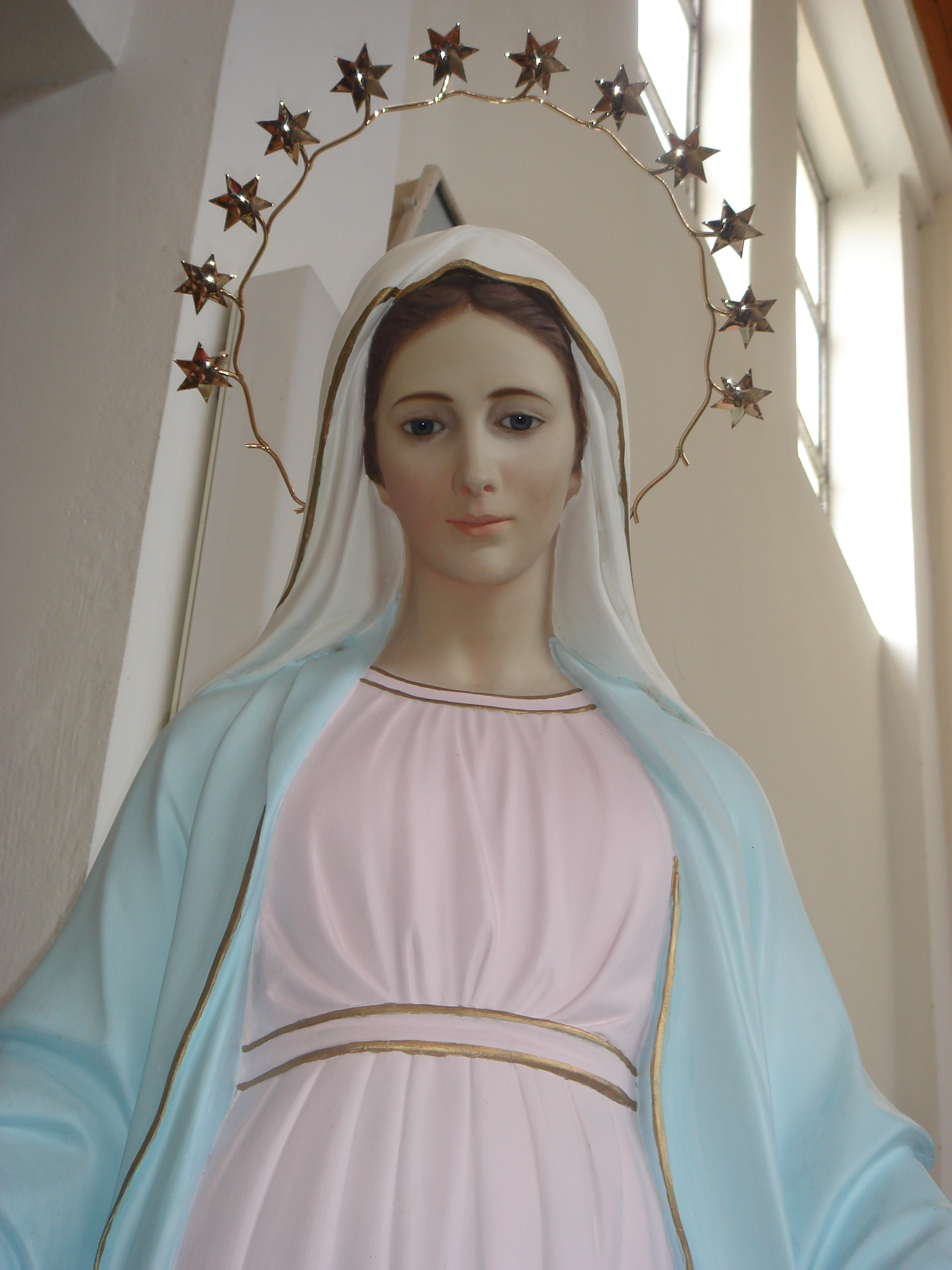
The Virgin Mary statue in Tihaljina commonly portrayed as the apparition of Our Lady of Medjugorje

On 25 June 1981, the day of the first alleged Virgin Mary apparition occurred, he was away from Medjugorje in Zagreb officiating at a meeting of Franciscan nuns. When he arrived back to Medjugorje he was surprised to see the church surrounded by a large crowd along with their many vehicles including tractors, cars, trucks and donkey carts. Zovko and his assistant, Father Čuvalo, were concerned because outside religious gatherings were forbidden in Yugoslavia and arrests could occur. He and Čuvalo decided the best thing to do was interview each visionary individually in detail while recording each one. Zovko was both curious and skeptical. He noticed that the seers became agitated if anyone hinted that they were lying and he was taken by the fact that their physical descriptions of the Gospa were consistent with each other.

He was suspicious at first when none of the visionaries used the exact words even when quoting the Madonna. He declined to go with the children that night to the mountain. However, Father Čuvalo and Father Kosir went to the mountain along with at least five thousand people. When they reported to Zovko afterward, Čuvalo said he asked Jakov to ask the Virgin what she wanted from the Franciscans. Randall Sullivan wrote that according to all six children, she said: "Have them persevere in the faith and protect the faith of others."

On 29 June during the afternoon mass Zovko was giving a sermon at the same time the children were being interrogated by representatives of the communist regime of Yugoslavia. They arrived in two vehicles and ordered the visionaries into a vehicle and took them to the police station for interrogation and then an examination by a pediatric specialist. It was determined that they were healthy physically and not on drugs. Next, they were taken to the morgue in the hospital where they viewed corpses in many stages of autopsy. They then were placed among the mentally ill in the psychiatric wing of the hospital and told they could end up here. They were frightened. Randall Sullivan wrote that it wasn't over and were driven to another town, Čitluk, to be examined by Dr. Ante Bijević who determined that each child was, "Normal, balanced, well-situated in time and in space, no hallucinations." When it was over, the medical experts concluded that each seer was both medically and mentally fine.

Zovko gave the seers several prayer books and rosaries and tried to teach them more about the church. He also gave Mirjana a book on apparitions in Lourdes, from which the visionaries concluded that their apparitions would last until 3 July 1981, as in Lourdes. Mirjana, one of the visionaries, told Zovko on 30 June 1981 on audiotape, that the Madonna told her that she would appear only for the next three days, that is until 3 July 1981. Ivanka, another visionary, confirmed this. Fr. Sivrić said to remember that Zovko asked the visionaries to ask the same question the day before on 29 June. The seers asked Madonna what the length of her visitations would be. She answered that she would continue for as long as they wanted. The visionaries, including Mirjana and Ivanka, continue to claim to have visions to this day.

Randall Sullivan wrote that Zovko was praying on his knees for direction in the St. James Church and all of a sudden he heard a voice clearly say, "Come out now and protect the children." He immediately went to the door and the girls were running from a nearby field towards him running from Communist authorities. He hid them in an inner room and locked them in. He told the authorities he had seen the children and the police ran off towards town away from the church. Later that afternoon the apparition took place in the church and Zovko was given the same vision that the visionaries see. Right then he became a fierce supporter of the apparitions. Zovko eventually was convinced of the children's accounts.

=== Communist authorities ===
From the middle to the end of July 1981, both the police and officials of the Communist League were demanding that the evening mass be discontinued. Sullivan wrote that he asked the visionaries to ask the Madonna about that and her reply was, "Continue to celebrate Mass". Zovko refused to stop the evening mass and the children, in order to protect the church, started to gather outside on Podbrdo. This enraged the government officials and as a result, they became more violent. On August 11 Zovko was summoned to the Communist Party headquarters in Mostar to be given a final warning - to stop the people from meeting on Podbrdo. The communist authorities also wanted the evening mass to be stopped. He refused once again. On August 17 the authorities arrested Zovko on the charge of sedition. Zovko was accused of making hostile and malicious allusions to the Yugoslav political system in two of his sermons, when he used the words "as a prison system and a ‘40-year-long slavery’ in which the people were exposed to ‘false teachings,’” according to Perica Vjekoslav. One of these sermons was presented on 11 July 1981 at the Saint James Church and the second one was presented two weeks later when Bishop Žanić's visited Medjugorje, according to the indictment. Perica Vjekoslav wrote that the state prosecutor said that the false teachings allegation was interpreted as an "attack on the League of Communists of Yugoslavia, Marxism, and self-management socialism."

On October 19, 1981 the visionaries were asked by the Madonna to fast on bread and water for a week while praying for Zovko. Rene Laurentin wrote that at that time she gave them a vision of Zovko in his prison cell and he "tells them not to be afraid for him, that everything was well." On October 21 Zovko was given a speedy trial in one day and was convicted of sedition.

According to Rene Laurentin, when the visionaries voiced concern for Zovko, the Madonna said that "Jozo looks well and he greets you warmly. Do not fear for Jozo. He is a saint. I have already told you." She also said that his punishment would be announced the next day and would not be severe. The next morning his sentence was announced and was reduced to 3 1/2 years in prison. Paul Kengor wrote, that the communists, in their persecution, "also smashed up the church, broke and scattered religious articles and generally ransacked the parish."

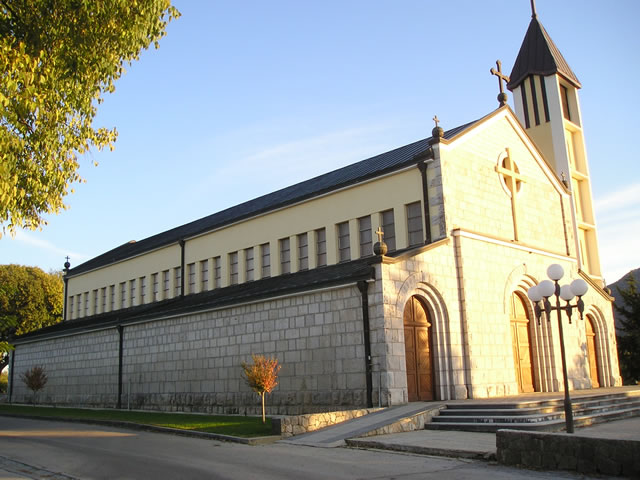
The Saint Elijah church in Tihaljina

In February 1983 the communists released Zovko after 18 months of hard labor. The condition upon his release was not to return to Medjugorje. According to Sullivan, he "emerged from prison gaunt, ashen, and nearly deaf in one ear,". He was then appointed a vicar in Tihaljina near Grude and remained in close touch with Medjugorje.

== Suspension ==
On 23 August 1989, Bishop Pavao Žanić suspended Zovko's priestly faculties in the two dioceses of Mostar-Duvno and Trebinje-Mrkan "due to his involvement in the conflict between the Franciscans and bishops over the division of parishes - which has been intense in Herzegovina for the last 40 years." Zovko objected to the Bishop's decree to the Holy See on 14 October 1989, only to see the Bishop's decree confirmed on 15 February 1990, with the ruling that the Bishop's sanction will remain in force until he retreats "to a friary remote from Medjugorje". Zovko was appointed a guardian for the Franciscan friary in Široki Brijeg and did not perform any pastoral duties. He continued to hear confessions, so the new Bishop Ratko Perić revoked his confessional jurisdiction as well in 1994.

After a five-year absence, Zovko made a surprise appearance in Medjugorje and spoke from the pulpit on 1 January 1990. He denounced the parishioners who put profit above religious practice. Sullivan wrote that Zovko said, "We must understand that all of this commercialism is against Medjugorje...I truly am angry about it." Father Slavko the current priest agreed with Zovko and demanded that the profiteers leave but the shopkeepers had the support of the communist government and didn't leave.

While Zovko said that the Bosnian War was a political rather than religious matter, he gave a sermon at Medjugorje where he stated that Mary is "...calling upon her people to pick up their swords put on their uniforms and stop the power of Satan." According to Professor Michael L. Budde, given that the Herzegovina Franciscans supported the Croatian Nationalists fighting the Bosnian Muslims, the "...reference was not to be understood biblically but historically - it was a reference to Islam."

According to Daniel Klimek, on 17 June 1992, Zovko met with John Paul II in Rome during the wars in former Yugoslavia and the pope said, "I give you my blessing. Take courage I am with you. Tell Medjugorje I am with you. Protect Medjugorje. Protect Our Lady's messages!” Mary Rourke wrote that Zovko also said, “the pope shook my hand, very firmly, and said ‘Guard Medjugorje, protect Medjugorje." According to Journalist Randall Sullivan, John Paul II received the nickname “Protector of Medjugorje” in Vatican circles as it was common knowledge in the Holy See that he loved Medjugorje. One of the ways he protected Medjugorje was by stopping a negative judgment on the apparitions from Pavao Žanić.

Zovko continued to promote the apparitions, traveling around the world, especially in the United States. On 5 November 2002, Zovko began a speaking tour in the United States. On this tour, the director of the Basilica of the National Shrine of the Immaculate Conception in Boston, Walter Rossi, forbade Zovko to hold a mass there after receiving a letter from the bishop of Mostar, Ratko Perić. Perić described Zovko as a "disobedient Franciscan" who had been stripped of "every faculty" to serve in public ministry since 1989. Cooperman wrote that Perić "did not explain the reasons for Zovko's original censure, which was imposed by Perić's predecessor, now deceased." The protesters handed out leaflets accusing Zovko of sexually molesting several women while in Medjugorje. According to Cooperman, Rev. Gerard A. Petta, the prayer service's organizer, said, "There is no credibility at all to the allegations of sexual abuse. It just doesn't exist." Zovko was not blocked from appearing anywhere else on his tour. In fact a few days later, Zovko held a sermon in Boston with no problems.

=== Outside Herzegovina ===
In 2005, the Franciscan Province of Dalmatia turned over the friary and island of Badija in Croatia to the Herzegovinian Franciscan Province for a term of 99 years. The respective provincials, Father Bernardin Škunca OFM and Father Slavko Soldo OFM, invited Zovko to relocate to the old Franciscan friary and oversee its restoration. The premises were in ruin - in a destitute condition. However, Zovko ignored the request for four years until 2009, when he agreed to move to the friary in Badija on 16 February 2009. There was an announcement that a commission will be formed in the Vatican very soon to re-investigate all the events in Medjugorje. According to Horvat, Zovko received a diagnosis from Italian doctors that he had "defibrillation of the heart and that the need for rest was necessary."

Afterward, Zovko lived between Badija and Graz in Austria, where he would come periodically. He was transferred to Zagreb, the capital of Croatia, in December 2011 and resides in the Franciscan monastery of the Herzegovinian Franciscan Province. He lives between the Franciscan monastery in Zagreb and the Franciscan monastery in Badija.

== Gospa - Movie about Medjugorje ==
Martin Sheen, a Catholic American actor, visited Medjugorje. He played Zovko in the drama film Gospa (Madonna), a 1995 Croatian movie directed by Jakov Sedlar.

== Works by Zovko ==
The online library called LibraryThing has a listing of the works of Jozo Zovko.

- As She Asks
- Behold Your Mother
- Father Jozo Zovko from Youth Festival, Medjugorje
- Guidati dalla regina della pace
- Living Presence: Reports of Eucharistic Miracles In America
- Novena ro the Siroki Brijeg Martyr
- Pregate il Santo Rosario ogni giorno
- Our Lady's Message of Prayer [CD]
- The Pilgrim's Guide to Medjugorje
- The Rosary: the simple prayer
- The Way of the Cross with Father Jozo Zovko
