= Yugoslavs =

South Slavic panethnicity

Regions with significant populations
- In countries that record ethnicity in censuses
- United States: 210,395 (2021) (Yugoslav Americans)
- Canada: 30,565 (2021) (Yugoslav Canadians)
- Serbia: 27,143 (2022) (Yugoslavs in Serbia)
- Australia: 26,883 (2011)
- Bosnia and Herzegovina: 2,570 (2013)
- Montenegro: 1,632 (2023)
- Croatia: 942 (2021)
- Slovenia: 527 (2002)
- North Macedonia: 344 (2021)
- Russia: 60 (2021)

Languages
- South Slavic languages, English

Religion
- Predominantly: Atheism; Eastern Orthodoxy; Roman Catholicism; Sunni Islam

Related ethnic groups
- South Slavs, other Slavic peoples

Yugoslavs or Yugoslavians (Note: Serbo-Croatian: Jugoslaveni/Jugosloveni, Југославени/Југословени Jugoslaveni is preferred in Croatian, Jugosloveni is preferred in Serbian and Montenegrin, while both are commonly used in Bosnian variety of the language.; Slovene: Jugoslovani; Macedonian: Југословени, romanized: Jugosloveni) is an identity that was originally conceived to refer to a united South Slavic people. It has been used in two connotations: the first in a sense of common shared ethnic descent, i.e. panethnic or supraethnic connotation for ethnic South Slavs, (Note: Serbo-Croatian term Jugoslaveni or Jugosloveni was a popular neutral supraethnic compound of jug ("south") and Slaveni/Sloveni (Slavs), literally meaning South Slavs, coined in late 19th century and officially adopted in 1929 by the authorities of Kingdom of Yugoslavia. "Yugoslavia" was adopted by English and other non-Slavic languages as a unique proper noun in favour of literal translations such as "South Slavia". Nowadays in Serbo-Croatian and other Slavic languages, Jugoslaven/Jugosloven refers exclusively to Yugoslavs, the people of Yugoslavia, and not South Slavs, the cultural and linguistic group; the latter is rendered in Serbo-Croatian as "južni Slaveni/Sloveni".) and the second as a term for all citizens of former Yugoslavia regardless of ethnicity. Cultural and political advocates of Yugoslav identity have historically purported the identity to be applicable to all people of South Slav heritage, including those of modern Bosnia and Herzegovina, Croatia, Montenegro, North Macedonia, Serbia, and Slovenia. Although Bulgarians are a South Slavic group as well, historical attempts at uniting Bulgaria with Yugoslavia were unsuccessful, and they were therefore traditionally excluded from the Yugoslav panethnic identification. Since the breakup of Yugoslavia and establishment of South Slavic nation states, the term ethnic Yugoslavs has been used to refer to those who exclusively view themselves as Yugoslavs with no other ethnic self-identification, many of these being of mixed ancestry.

In the former Yugoslavia, the official designation for those who declared themselves simply as Yugoslav was with quotation marks, "Yugoslavs" (introduced in census 1971). The quotation marks were originally meant to distinguish Yugoslav ethnicity from Yugoslav citizenship, which was written without quotation marks. The majority of those who had once identified as ethnic "Yugoslavs" reverted to or adopted traditional ethnic and national identities, sometimes due to social pressure, intimidation, detrimental consequences, or prevention from continuing to identify as Yugoslav by new political authorities. Some also decided to turn to sub-national regional identifications, especially in multi-ethnic historical regions like Istria, Vojvodina, or Bosnia (hence Bosnians). The Yugoslav designation, however, continues to be used by many, especially in the United States, Canada, and Australia by the descendants of Yugoslav migrants who emigrated while the country still existed.

== History ==
=== Yugoslavism and Yugoslavia ===
Since the late 18th century, when traditional European ethnic affiliations started to mature into modern ethnic identities, there have been numerous attempts to define a common South Slavic ethnic identity. The word Yugoslav, meaning "South Slavic", was first used by Josip Juraj Strossmayer in 1849. The first modern iteration of Yugoslavism was the Illyrian movement in Habsburg Croatia. It identified South Slavs with ancient Illyrians and sought to construct a common language based on the Shtokavian dialect. The movement was led by Ljudevit Gaj, whose Latin alphabet became one of two official scripts used for the Serbo-Croatian language.

Among notable supporters of Yugoslavism and a Yugoslav identity active at the beginning of the 20th century were famous sculptor Ivan Meštrović (1883–1962), who called Serbian folk hero Prince Marko "our Yugoslav people with its gigantic and noble heart" and wrote poetry speaking of a "Yugoslav race"; Jovan Cvijić, in his article The Bases of Yugoslav Civilization, developed the idea of a unified Yugoslav culture and stated that "New qualities that until now have been expressed but weakly will appear. An amalgamation of the most fertile qualities of our three tribes [Serbs, Croats, Slovenes] will come forth every more strongly, and thus will be constructed the type of single Yugoslav civilization-the final and most important goal of our country." In late 19th and early 20th century, influential public intellectuals Jovan Cvijić and Vladimir Dvorniković advocated that Yugoslavs, as a supra-ethnic nation, had "many tribal ethnicities, such as Croats, Serbs, and others within it."

On 28 June 1914, Gavrilo Princip shot and killed Archduke Franz Ferdinand, the heir to the Austrian throne, and his wife, in Sarajevo. Princip was a member of Young Bosnia, a group whose aims included the unification of the Yugoslavs and independence from Austria-Hungary. The assassination in Sarajevo set into motion a series of fast-moving events that eventually escalated into full-scale war. After his capture, during his trial, he stated "I am a Yugoslav nationalist, aiming for the unification of all Yugoslavs, and I do not care what form of state, but it must be free from Austria."

In June–July 1917, the Yugoslav Committee met with the Serbian Government in Corfu and on 20 July the Corfu Declaration that laid the foundation for the post-war state was issued. The preamble stated that the Serbs, Croats and Slovenes were "the same by blood, by language, by the feelings of their unity, by the continuity and integrity of the territory which they inhabit undivided, and by the common vital interests of their national survival and manifold development of their moral and material life." The state was created as the Kingdom of Serbs, Croats and Slovenes, a constitutional monarchy under the Karađorđević dynasty. The term "Yugoslavs" was used to refer to all of its inhabitants, but particularly to those of South Slavic ethnicity. Some Croatian nationalists viewed the Serb plurality and Serbian royal family as hegemonic. Eventually, a conflict of interest sparked among the Yugoslav peoples. In 1929, King Alexander sought to resolve a deep political crisis brought on by ethnic tensions by assuming dictatorial powers in the 6 January Dictatorship, renaming the country "Kingdom of Yugoslavia", and officially pronouncing that there is one single Yugoslav nation with three tribes. The Yugoslav ethnic designation was thus imposed for a period of time on all South Slavs in Yugoslavia. Changes in Yugoslav politics after King Alexander's death in 1934 brought an end to this policy, but the designation continued to be used by some people.

Philosopher Vladimir Dvorniković advocated the establishment of a Yugoslav ethnicity in his 1939 book entitled "The Characterology of the Yugoslavs". His views included eugenics and cultural blending to create one, strong Yugoslav nation.

There had on three occasions been efforts to make Bulgaria a part of Yugoslavia or part of an even larger federation: through Aleksandar Stamboliyski during and after World War I; through Zveno during the Bulgarian coup d'état of 1934, and through Georgi Dimitrov during and after World War II, but for various reasons, each attempt turned out to be unsuccessful.

=== Self-identification in Yugoslavia ===
Unitary policies implemented by the authorities of the early 20th century Kingdom of Yugoslavia aimed at creating a single Yugoslav ethnic identity that speaks one South Slavic language were met with heavy resistance by majorities of the country's citizens. Those policies and attempts at concentration of power within the ruling Serbian royal dynasty, the Karađorđevićs, were interpreted by opponents of Yugoslav unitarism and Serbian nationalism as gradual Serbianization of Yugoslavia's non-Serb population.

After the country was liberated from Axis occupiers in the World War II in Yugoslavia by the Yugoslav Partisans, the newly established socialist Yugoslavia was instead organized as a federation. The ruling League of Communists of Yugoslavia was ideologically opposed to ethnic unitarism that was promoted under former royal hegemony, instead recognizing and promoting ethnic diversity and social Yugoslavism within the notion of "brotherhood and unity" between nations and national minorities of Yugoslavia. Traditional ethnic identities again became the primary ethnic designations used by most inhabitants of Yugoslavia which remained the case until the country's dissolution in the early 1990s.

Josip Broz Tito expressed his desire for an undivided Yugoslav ethnicity to develop naturally when he stated, "I would like to live to see the day when Yugoslavia would become amalgamated into a firm community, when she would no longer be a formal community but a community of a single Yugoslav nation."

Percentage identifying as Yugoslav
| Region | 1961 | 1971 | 1981 |
|---|---|---|---|
| Croatia | 0.4 | 1.9 | 8.2 |
| Central Serbia | 0.2 | 1.4 | 4.8 |
| Bosnia and Herzegovina | 8.4 | 1.2 | 7.9 |
| Kosovo | 0.5 | 0.1 | 0.1 |
| Macedonia | 0.1 | 0.2 | 0.7 |
| Montenegro | 0.3 | 2.1 | 5.3 |
| Slovenia | 0.2 | 0.4 | 1.4 |
| Vojvodina | 0.2 | 2.4 | 8.2 |
| Yugoslavia | 1.7 | 1.3 | 5.4 |

Yugoslav censuses reflected Tito's ideal, with "Yugoslav" being an available identification for both ethnicity and nationality. In general, the Yugoslav identity was more common in the multiethnic regions of the country, i.e. the more multiethnic the constituent republic, the higher the percentage; therefore the highest were in Croatia, Montenegro, Central Serbia, Vojvodina, and Bosnia and Herzegovina, while the lowest were in Slovenia, Macedonia, and Kosovo. The 1971 census recorded 273,077 Yugoslavs, or 1.33% of the total population. The 1981 census, a year after the death of Tito, recorded a record number of 1,216,463 or 5.4% Yugoslavs.

- In the 1991 census, 5.54% (242,682) of the inhabitants of Bosnia and Herzegovina declared themselves to be Yugoslav. The Constitution of the Republic of Bosnia and Herzegovina from 1990 ratified a Presidency of seven members. One of the seven was to be elected among/by the republic's Yugoslavs, thereby introducing the Yugoslavs next to ethnic Muslims, Serbs and Croats into the Constitutional framework of Bosnia and Herzegovina although on an inferior level. However, because of the Bosnian War that erupted in 1992, this Constitution was short-lived and unrealized.
- Approximately 5% of the population of Montenegro also declared themselves Yugoslav in the same census.
- The 1981 census showed that Yugoslavs made up around 8.2% of the population in Croatia, this being the highest ever percentage of Yugoslavs within a constituent republic's borders. The percentage was the highest in multiethnic regions and cities with large non-Croatian population and among those of mixed ancestry. The 1991 census data indicated that the number of Yugoslavs had dropped to 2% of the population in Croatia.
- The autonomous region of Vojvodina, marked by its traditionally multiethnic make-up, recorded a similar percentage as Croatia at the 1981 census, with ~8% of its 2 million inhabitants declaring themselves Yugoslav.

Just before and after the dissolution of Yugoslavia, most Yugoslavs reverted to their ethnic and regional identities.

== Successor states ==
=== Self-identification following dissolution ===
Self-identified Yugoslavs
| Country | Number (census year) |
|---|---|
| Bosnia and Herzegovina | 2,570 (2013) |
| Croatia | 942 (2021) |
| Kosovo | Unknown |
| Montenegro | 1,632 (2023) |
| North Macedonia | 344 (2021) |
| Serbia | 27,143 (2022) |
| Slovenia | 527 (2002) |

The number of people identifying as Yugoslav fell drastically in all successor states since the beginning of the 21st century and the conclusion of all Yugoslav Wars and separation of Serbia and Montenegro (until 2003 called FR Yugoslavia). The country with the highest number of people and percentage of population identifying as Yugoslav is Serbia, while North Macedonia is the lowest on both. No official figures or reliable estimates are available for Kosovo.

As part of the research project "Strategies of Symbolic Nation-building in South Eastern Europe", a study was conducted from 2010 to 2014 on the entire former Yugoslav territory with the exception of Slovenia. Within the study, a poll was conducted on the topic of shared identity. Interviewees were asked whether they ever "felt Yugoslav", with three given options being tantamount to "yes, still do", "no, never did" and "not anymore". In all six examined states, majority of the interviewees expressed that they either never or no longer felt so, ranging from ~70–98%, with Serbia being on the lowest end and Kosovo on the highest. Croatia and Kosovo yielded the most clear-cut results with 95% stating either of aforementioned options and less than 3% stating that they still felt Yugoslav. In Kosovo in particular, over 92% stated that they never felt Yugoslav. In contrast, Montenegro and Serbia were the most split states, with ~28% and ~32% respectively stating that they still felt Yugoslav; the two were the only states where more interviewees stated feeling Yugoslav as opposed to never feeling so. Bosnia and Herzegovina had the highest percentage of interviewees stating that they no longer feel Yugoslav at ~48%, followed closely by Montenegro and Serbia. The following table provides more details:

| Do you ever feel like a Yugoslav? | Bosnia and Herzegovina | Croatia | Kosovo | North Macedonia | Montenegro | Serbia |
|---|---|---|---|---|---|---|
| Yes, I still feel that way | 19.2% | 2.8% | 2.0% | 14.9% | 28.1% | 31.8% |
| I used to feel that way, but not anymore | 48.1% | 29.1% | 5.8% | 38.2% | 46.4% | 42.9% |
| No, I never felt like a Yugoslav | 32.5% | 66.3% | 92.1% | 47.0% | 23.7% | 24.4% |

=== Organizations ===
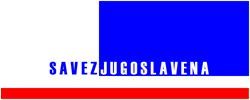
Logo of the Alliance of Yugoslavs

The Yugoslavs of Croatia have several organizations. The "Alliance of Yugoslavs" (Savez Jugoslavena), established in 2010 in Zagreb, is an association aiming to unite the Yugoslavs of Croatia, regardless of religion, sex, political or other views. Its main goal is the official recognition of the Yugoslav nation in every Yugoslav successor state: Croatia, Slovenia, Serbia, North Macedonia, Bosnia and Herzegovina and Montenegro.

Another pro-Yugoslav organization advocating the recognition of the Yugoslav nation is the "Our Yugoslavia" association (Udruženje "Naša Jugoslavija"), which is an officially registered organization in Croatia. The seat of Our Yugoslavia is in the Istrian town of Pula, where it was founded on 30 July 2009. The association has most members in the towns of Rijeka, Zagreb and Pula. Its main aim is the stabilisation of relations among the Yugoslav successor states. It is also active in Bosnia and Herzegovina, however, its official registration as an association was denied by the Bosnian state authorities.

The probably best-known pro-Yugoslav organization in Montenegro is the "Consulate-general of the SFRY" with its headquarters in the coastal town of Tivat. Prior to the population census of 2011, Marko Perković, the president of this organization called on the Yugoslavs of Montenegro to freely declare their Yugoslav identity on the upcoming census.

== Notable people ==
The best known example of self-declared Yugoslavs is Marshal Josip Broz Tito who organized resistance against Nazi Germany in Yugoslavia, ended the Axis occupation of Yugoslavia with the help of the Red Army, co-founded the Non-Aligned Movement, and defied Joseph Stalin's Soviet pressure on Yugoslavia. Other people that declared as "Yugoslavs" include intellectuals, entertainers, singers, and athletes, such as:

- Marina Abramović (born 1946), Belgrade-born performance artist
- Ivo Andrić (1892–1975), Dolac-born novelist, poet and short story writer
- Đorđe Balašević (1953–2021), Novi Sad-born singer-songwriter and poet
- Goran Bregović (born 1950), Sarajevo-born musician
- Lepa Brena (born 1960), Tuzla-born singer and businesswoman
- Joška Broz (1947–2025), Belgrade-born politician
- Oliver Dulić (born 1975), Belgrade-born politician
- Srđan Dragojević (born 1963), Belgrade-born film director and screenwriter
- Đorđe Đogani (born 1960), Belgrade-born musician
- Branko Đurić (born 1962), Sarajevo-born actor, director and musician
- Ivan Ergić (born 1981), Šibenik-born retired footballer
- Andrej Grubačić (born 1976), historian and activist
- Ekrem Jevrić (1961–2016), Plav-born television personality and singer
- Branko Kockica (born 1946), Zemun-born actor
- Božo Koprivica (1950–2026), Nikšić-born essayist, dramatic advisor and literary critic
- Magnifico (born 1965), Ljubljana-born musician
- Igor Mandić (1939–2022), Šibenik-born writer, literary critic, columnist and essayist
- Milan Milišić (1941–1991), Dubrovnik-born poet, translator, author and journalist
- Ašok Murti (born 1962), Šabac-born fashion stylist
- Ivica Osim (1941–2022), Sarajevo-born footballer and football manager
- Srđa Popović (1937–2013), Belgrade-born lawyer and political activist
- Dževad Prekazi (born 1957), Kosovska Mitrovica-born retired footballer
- Senidah (born 1985), Ljubljana-born singer-songwriter
- Miljenko Smoje (1923–1995), Split-born writer and journalist
- Branimir Štulić (born 1953), Skopje-born musician and author
- Bogdan Tanjević (born 1947), Pljevlja-born basketball coach and retired player
- Dubravka Ugrešić (1949–2023), Kutina-born writer
- Jovan Vavic (born 1961 or 1962), Herceg Novi-raised water polo coach
- Duško Vujošević (born 1959), Podgorica-born former basketball coach
- Milić Vukašinović (born 1950), Belgrade-born musician
- Marijan Beneš (1951-2018) Belgrade-born boxer

== Symbols ==
The probably most frequently used symbol of the Yugoslavs to express their identity and to which they are most often associated with is the blue-white-red tricolor flag with a yellow-bordered red star in the flag's center, which also served as the national flag of the Socialist Federal Republic of Yugoslavia between 1945 and 1991.

Prior to World War II, the symbol of Yugoslavism was a plain tricolor flag of blue, white, and red, which was also the national flag of the Kingdom of Yugoslavia, the Yugoslav state in the interwar period.

== See also ==
- Czechoslovaks
- Demographics of Yugoslavia
- Ethnogenesis
- Meta-ethnicity
- Multiculturalism
- Pan-Slavism
- Pan-nationalism
- The Erased
- Titoism
- Yugo-nostalgia
- Yugoslavism
- Yugosphere

== Sources ==
- Djokić, Dejan (2003). Yugoslavism: Histories of a Failed Idea, 1918–1992. C. Hurst & Co. Publishers. ISBN 978-1-85065-663-0.
- Jović, Dejan (2009). Yugoslavia: A State that Withered Away. Purdue University Press. ISBN 978-1-55753-495-8.
- Perica, Vjekoslav (2002). Balkan Idols: Religion and Nationalism in Yugoslav States. Oxford University Press. doi:10.1093/0195148568.001.0001. ISBN 0-19-517429-1.
- Ramet, Sabrina P. (2006). The Three Yugoslavias: State-building and Legitimation, 1918-2005. Indiana University Press. ISBN 0-253-34656-8.
- Trbovich, Ana S. (2008). A Legal Geography of Yugoslavia's Disintegration. Oxford University Press. ISBN 978-0-19-533343-5.
