= Jakov Sedlar =

Croatian film director and producer (born 1952)

- Born: 6 November 1952 (age 74); Split, SR Croatia, Yugoslavia (now Croatia)
- Occupations: Film director, film producer
- Known for: Nationalist documentary films, Gospa, Jasenovac – The Truth
- Spouses: Nina Er Grott; Almira Osmanović
- Children: Dominik, Marija and Emili Ema
- Awards: Order of Danica Hrvatska

Jakov Sedlar (born 6 November 1952) is a Croatian film director and producer. A former cultural attaché during the 1990s in the Franjo Tuđman government, his documentaries promote Croatian nationalist views through propaganda. His 2016 documentary Jasenovac – The Truth sparked controversy and condemnation for downplaying and denying the crimes committed at the Jasenovac concentration camp by the Ustaše during World War II, instead focusing on crimes supposedly committed against Croats by communist Partisans at the camp following the war, while using alleged misinformation and forgeries to present its case, in addition to naming former and current Croatian officials, intellectuals, historians and journalists it dubs as "Yugoslav nationalists concealing the truth".

== Biography ==
Sedlar was born in Split, SR Croatia, Yugoslavia in 1952. In 1972, he moved to Zagreb, where he studied South Slavic languages, Western literature and philosophy at the University of Zagreb. After his graduation in 1977, he enrolled in the Academy of Dramatic Arts and studied theatre and film directing, graduating in 1981.

Sedlar was the Croatian Government's "official propagandist" during the Yugoslav Wars of the 1990s, according to the historian Vjekoslav Perica. Sedlar became known for films such as Gospa and Četverored, which portray the events of World War II and the Cold War from a Croatian nationalist perspective. He also made a number of documentaries glorifying wartime President Franjo Tuđman and his party, the right-wing Croatian Democratic Union (HDZ). In an apparent bid to increase their credibility abroad, several were filmed in the English language, with actor Martin Sheen narrating. In 1996, Tuđman persuaded him to accept the post of the first cultural attaché in the United States (New York), where he remained until 2000. During that time, he launched various projects and organized numerous events to promote Croatian culture. Joe Tripician, who was hired to write the official biography of Tuđman and co-directed the documentary Tudjman with Sedlar (though Tripician claims he barely worked on the film and was shocked when he saw his name on it), describes Sedlar as the "Leni Riefenstahl of Croatia — but without the talent."

After his return from the United States in 2000, the newly elected coalition government demoted Sedlar.

== Controversies ==
Sedlar was criticized for nationalism and politicization in his films. On 4 April 2016, his documentary Jasenovac – The Truth premiered. The documentary is about the alleged crimes committed by the communist authorities of the FPR Yugoslavia in the Jasenovac concentration camp between 1945 and 1951 following the World War II, which, as claimed in the documentary, were covered up. The film also downplays and denies the extent of the Holocaust in the Independent State of Croatia, as well as the World War II-era genocide of Serbs, contending that the number of victims were exaggerated through post-war Yugoslavian communist propaganda. At the end of the documentary, Sedlar leaves the alleged communist crimes, moves to the modern era and mentions various leftists who allegedly "cover up communist crimes" (naming Presidents Stjepan Mesić and Ivo Josipović, and Serb MP Milorad Pupovac) as well as various journalists who allegedly help them (Miljenko Jergović, Jurica Pavičić, Ante Tomić, Davor Butković and others), which was considered tendentious and irrelevant to the theme of the documentary, as well as a way of labeling people he considered inadequate. Slavko Goldstein said that the documentary was "full of half-truths, lies and forgeries", and that the end in which some public figures are named was a "direct arrest warrant and indictment against individuals."

Vladimir Matijanić wrote for the Slobodna Dalmacija that the documentary "does not prove that after the liberation, the Partisans carried out mass executions of the prisoners, or that the Jasenovac concentration camp was solely a 'working and internment camp'" (as claimed in the documentary). Another controversy connected to the documentary is the alleged title in the Vjesnik newspaper from 1945 stating that corpses tossed into the Sava were reaching Zagreb from the direction of Jasenovac. Shortly after the premiere, journalist Lovro Krnić went through the Zagreb state archives and examined all the May 1945 issues of Vjesnik and found that no such headline existed. Upon closer inspection, Krnić discovered that the headline seen in the documentary had been crudely doctored, likely using Photoshop. Attorney Veljko Miljević stated that Sedlar could end up in prison due to charges of falsification, denial of crime and hate speech against politicians and journalists.

In April 2017, the Simon Wiesenthal Center sent a letter to the Zagreb City Council it had received from Robert Rozett, the director of the Yad Vashem libraries. In it, Rozett apparently noted that having the films in the Visual Center is in no way an endorsement of their content. The Simon Wiesenthal Center urged the Zagreb City Council to deny Sedlar an award from the city, which was partially based on his films being available through Yad Vashem. Yad Vashem's apparent distancing from Sedlar did not deter him from continuing to use this example to legitimize the historic value of his work.

== Legal issues ==
In 2000, a police investigation was launched into several criminal offenses allegedly perpetrated by Sedlar. In an influential magazine, Nacional, Sedlar was described as "a publicly denounced forger, fraudster, manipulator and financial broker". In 2004, he was charged with evasion of prolonged parking ticket fines worth approximately HRK30,000 at the time (≈US$5,000). In 2018, Australia annulled his previously issued visa.

== Filmography ==
=== Feature films ===
Year	Title	Notes
1988	U sredini mojih dana (1988)	
1995	Gospa	
1996	Don't Forget Me	
1998	Agonija	
1998	Remembrance of Georgia	
1999	File of Four	
2003	Mercy of the Sea	co-directed with Dominik Sedlar
2018	Duhovi	
2021	The Match	co-directed with Dominik Sedlar
2022	The Conversation	producer
2025	260 Days	

=== Docudramas ===
Year	Film	Director	Writer	Notes
2004	Syndrome Jerusalem	Yes	Yes	
2009	Café Auschwitz	Yes	No	

=== Selected documentaries ===
Year	Film	Director	Writer	Notes
1984	Međugorje, Gospi u pohode	Yes	No	
1987	Lijepa naša	Yes	No	
1987	Jeste li bili u Zagrebu, gospodine Lumiere	Yes	No	
1988	U srednih mojih dana	Yes	No	
1989	Hrvatski Božić	Yes	No	Video
1991	Jugoslavenska armija i srpski teroristi	Yes	No	Video
1991	Krvavi Uskrs	Yes	No	Video
1991	Pomozite Hrvatskoj	Yes	No	Video
1991	Srpski vidovi smrti	Yes	No	Video
1991	Stepinac - znak vremena	Yes	No	Video
1992	Nepoznati dio Holokausta, Srbija 1941-1945	Yes	No	
1993	Trinaest stoljeca hrvatske kulture	Yes	No	Video
1996	Mozart of Basketball	Yes	No	
1997	Tuđman – hrvatski George Washington	Yes	No	
1999	To je put	Yes	No	
2002	Brač, Dalmacija, Hrvatska	Yes	No	
2002	Sudbina mi nije dala da odem	Yes	No	
2005	Yudith	Yes	No	Short
2005	Kad mrtvi glasuju	Yes	No	
2006	Nema više heroja	Yes	No	Short
2006	Hrvatska Ljubavi moja	Yes	No	
2006	Petnaest do osam	Yes	No	
2006	Searching for Orson	Yes	No	
2007	Mayim, Mayim	Yes	No	
2009	Hrvatske katedrale	Yes	No	
2009	Ruža Pospiš-Baldani	Yes	No	
2009	Gotovina, pisma iz Haga	Yes	No	
2009	Ante Pavelić bez maske	Yes	No	
2010	Tito bez maske	Yes	No	
2010	Pravednik Stepinac	Yes	No	
2010	Yulia	Yes	No	
2011	Caffe Auschwitz	Yes	No	
2011	Bitka za Dajlu	Yes	No	
2011	Hrvati i njihovi franjevci u USA i Canadi	Yes	No	
2011	Hrvati i Srbi, povijest jedne averzije	Yes	No	
2012	Ljubav koja ne poznaje granica	Yes	No	Short
2012	Tko želi ubiti Juliju Timošenko	Yes	No	
2014	Julija, ona koja se nikada ne predaje	Yes	No	Short
2014	Anne Frank: Then and Now	Yes	No	
2016	Jasenovac – The Truth	Yes	No	
2016	The Righteous Gypsy	Yes	No	Short
2016	Nisam se bojao umrijeti	Yes	No	
2016	Requiem for the World	Yes	No	
2017	Adel i Mara	Yes	No	
2017	Snaga tišine	Yes	No	
2017	Svetac, zločinac i dvorske lude	Yes	No	
2019	3069	Yes	Yes	
2019	Zagrljaj sudbine	Yes	No	
2022	Once Upon a Time in Croatia	Yes	No	
