= Remembrance of Georgia =

Remembrance of Georgia (Sjećanje na Georgiju) is a Croatian film directed by Jakov Sedlar. It was released in 2002.
