= Don't Forget Me (1996 film) =

Don't Forget Me (Ne zaboravi me, also known as Fergismajniht) is a 1996 Croatian film directed by Jakov Sedlar.
