= In the Midst of My Days =

In the Midst of My Days (U sredini mojih dana) is a 1988 Croatian film directed by Jakov Sedlar.

== Sources ==
- U sredini mojih dana at hrfilm.hr (in Croatian)
