= Mercy of the Sea =

Mercy of the Sea (Croatian: Milost mora) is a 2003 Croatian-Israeli war drama film directed by Dominik and Jakov Sedlar, starring Renée Estevez, Kevin Albano, Martin Sheen and Mike Bernardo.

== Plot ==
Ana (Renée Estevez) lost her husband and brother in the Siege of Vukovar, but the disappearance of her son Anthony (Kevin Albano), after he was taken away by Yugoslav People's Army soldiers, affected her the most. Years later, she is trying to locate him in belief he is still alive. Her friend Ivan, a postman (Mike Bernardo), delivers her a letter from uncle Frederik in Dubrovnik (Martin Sheen), saying Anthony has been found. Ana goes to Dubrovnik, experiencing unusual encounters on her way there...

== Reception ==
Croatian Film Association's database describes Mercy of the Sea as a "solid work [...] aimed chiefly at the US television market" which "mostly harmoniously blends the real with the phantasmagorical".

Croatian film critic Tomislav Kurelec, writing for Vijenac, compared Mercy of the Sea favorably to Jakov Sedlar's earlier films, but remarked that Sedlar "does not rely on film techniques to express his views, but rather puts them in the mouths of his protagonists as explicit messages".

A review in Večernji list daily praised the acting, with the exception of Mike Bernardo's performance, but noted that the film's unevenness, ranging from "very good" to "exceptionally bad", ultimately resulted in an "interesting if mediocre work".
