= Gospa =

- Directed by: Jakov Sedlar
- Written by: Ivan Aralica; Paul Gronseth; Barry Morrow
- Produced by: Igor Prižmić
- Starring: Martin Sheen; Paul Guilfoyle; Frank Finlay; Morgan Fairchild; Michael York; Timothy Wheeler; Daniela Čolić-Prižmić; Anica Tomić; Paul Tivers
- Release date: 13 October 1995
- Running time: 125 minutes
- Countries: Croatia; United States
- Language: English
- Budget: $4.7 million

Gospa (Croatian for "Madonna" or "Our Lady") is a 1995 religious drama starring Martin Sheen and Morgan Fairchild about pilgrimages to a small Herzegovinian village of Međugorje where six school children say the Virgin Mary appeared in 1981.

The movie highlights persecutions of Catholic Croats, particularly of the clergy, by the communist authorities of the Socialist Federal Republic of Yugoslavia. Martin Sheen plays Franciscan priest Jozo Zovko, who was tried for sedition by the Yugoslav government.

== Cast ==
- Martin Sheen as Father Jozo Zovko
- Michael York as Milan Vuković
- Morgan Fairchild as Sister Fabijana Zovko
- Paul Guilfoyle as Miodrag Dobrović
- Ray Girardin as Father Zrinko Čuvalo
- Frank Finlay as Monsignor
- Tony Zazula as prosecutor Govanović
- William Hootkins as judge Marulić
- Angelo Santiago as Vlado Palić
- Mustafa Nadarević as major Stović
- Slavko Brankov as 2nd Jail Guard
- Nela Čolić-Prizmić as French Journalist
- Anica Tomić as Mirjana Dragičević

== Production ==
During production, actor Vasek Simek died during a break in filming. Simek had a co-starring role in the film, and collapsed while attending a play at the Croatian National theater. Director Jakov Sedlar decided to dedicate the film to his memory.

== Reception ==
The film won the Golden Gate of Pula (audience award for best film as voted by festival audiences) at the 42nd Pula Film Festival, and Vjesnik award Jelen.

Roger Ebert gave Gospa two stars out of four. He noted the enthusiastic responses by the film's audiences in the United States, but felt that its "impact is religious and political, not cinematic", and that "it really isn't a very good film". In 2014, Croatian TV critic Zrinka Pavlić described it as a "bad film, with bad acting and an almost cartoon-like depiction of the situation it deals with".

Film critic and Catholic priest Peter Malone writes that the film's "strong pro-Croatian perspective seems more propaganda-like than informative" and most of the dialogue is "stilted writing".
