= Četverored =

1999 film

- Directed by: Jakov Sedlar
- Written by: Ivan Aralica
- Based on: Četverored by Ivan Aralica
- Produced by: Jakov Sedlar
- Starring: Ivan Marević; Ena Begović
- Cinematography: Igor Sunara
- Edited by: Zdravko Borko; Ivica Drnić
- Music by: Zlatko Tanodi
- Release date: 7 December 1999
- Running time: 136 minutes
- Country: Croatia
- Language: Croatian

Četverored is 1999 Croatian drama war film directed by Jakov Sedlar. Based on the novel of the same name by Ivan Aralica, the plot of the film deals with the Bleiburg massacre. It was the first film to deal with the subject, formerly a taboo topic under the Communist government. Četverored was aired on television only a week after its theatrical release in Zagreb, in what was characterised by part of the public as an electoral ploy to support the ruling Croatian Democratic Union (HDZ), which subsequently lost the 2000 elections.

== Plot ==
The film shows the atmosphere in Zagreb before the arrival of the Yugoslav Partisans and focuses on the fate of a group of actors of the Croatian National Theatre in Zagreb who decide to go into exile with parts of the defeated Croatian Home Guard. Their fates intertwine with the fates of soldiers and civilians on the way to Bleiburg, following the ever-increasing uncertainty into which they go, the complete anarchy that follows the retreat and the cruel confrontations that occur between individual military leaders blinded by hatred and defeat. In the second part of the chronicle, after the surrender and capture on the Bleiburg field, the refugees go through a harsh captivity on the Way of the Cross, where they are tormented by hunger and thirst, and death lurks at every step.

== Cast ==
- Ivan Marević as Ivan Telebar
- Ena Begović as Mirta Mešog. This was Begović's last film role before her death in a car accident in August 2000.
- Goran Navojec as Baja Mešog
- Nadežda Perišić-Nola as Marguerita
- Zvonimir Zoričić as Zlatko Trlin
- Nada Abrus as Malvina
- Boris Buzančić as Senjak
- Mia Oremović as Gost
- Filip Šovagović as poručnik Hunjeta
- Tamara Garbajs as Magdalena
- Zoran Čubrilo as "Crnac" na motoru
- Vera Zima as nadstojnica časne službe
- Dejan Aćimović as Šaban
- Hrvoje Klobučar as tupi domobran
- Ante Čedo Martinić as Ante Moškov
- Luka Peroš

== Critical reception ==
The Croatian Cinema Database website's entry for the movie gave the film a largely negative review, writing that screenwriter Ivan Aralica and director Jakov Sedlar "turned the film into an expression of caricatured intolerance towards (Serbian and Montenegrin) Partisans" and that its "hate speech and utter nonsense" overshadowed any potential it might've had.

Historian Jelena Batinić argued that, despite the film's high production value and prominent Croatian actors, it "rarely rises above the level of a propaganda pamphlet with crude ethnic stereotyping" for portraying the mostly Serb Partisans as vicious murderers and Croat prisoners as innocent victims.

Professor Dijana Jelača of Brooklyn College listed Četverored as among the post-Yugoslav nationalist revisionist films which use events of the past, reconstructing them in order to "warn generations to come" of the never-ending threats to nationhood. In this case, Jelača argued communism was presented as being on equal footing, if not worse, than fascism. Film scholar Dino Murtić described the film as "perhaps the most inglorious example of the cinema of self-victimisation" made during the 1990s as Yugoslavia had disintegrated.
