= Tihaljina =

Village in Grude, Bosnia and Herzegovina

Tihaljina Тихаљина
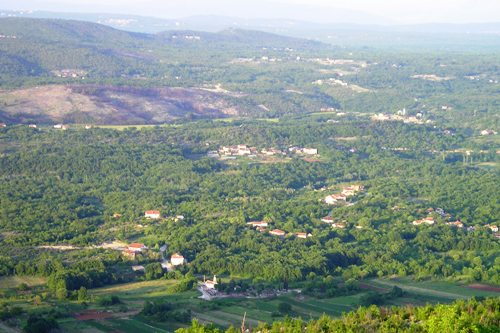

- Location within Bosnia and Herzegovina
- Coordinates: 43°19′28″N 17°22′11″E
- Country: Bosnia and Herzegovina
- Entity: Federation of Bosnia and Herzegovina
- Canton: West Herzegovina
- Municipality: Grude

Area
  - Total: 14.95 sq mi (38.73 km^{2})

Population (2013)
  - Total: 1,466
  - Density: 98.04/sq mi (37.85/km^{2})
- Time zone: UTC+1 (CET)
  - Summer (DST): UTC+2 (CEST)

Tihaljina is a town in southwestern Bosnia and Herzegovina. It is in the West Herzegovina Canton of the Federation of Bosnia and Herzegovina. It is part of the Grude municipality. It has many cemeteries.

== Demographics ==
According to the 1991 Yugoslav census, there were 1,734 residents in the town of Tihaljina, of 1,732 were ethnic Croats.

According to the 2013 census, its population was 1,466.

Ethnicity in 2013
Ethnicity	Number	Percentage
Croats	1,460	99.4%
other/undeclared	6	0.0%
Total	1,466	100%
