= Balkan Idols =

2002 book by Vjekoslav Perica

- Author: Vjekoslav Perica
- Publisher: Oxford University Press
- Publication date: 2002
- ISBN: 0-19-517429-1

Balkan Idols: Religion and Nationalism in Yugoslav States (ISBN 0-19-517429-1) is a book by Vjekoslav Perica. It was first published in 2002 by Oxford University Press.

The book explores the political roles of different religious organisations in the republics of the former Yugoslavia. Balkan Idols was described as a significant work in several reviews in academic journals.

== Reception ==
Balkan Idols was praised by Josip Mocnik in Contemporary Church History Quarterly as "masterfully written and extensively researched". Writing for the Journal of the American Academy of Religion, Franke Wilmer described the book as a "remarkably balanced" work that shows "how socially and politically destructive the volatile interplay between fundamentalism and the magnification of unresolved or unreconciled narratives of victimization ... can be."

Peter Korchnak of the Global Review of Ethnopolitics wrote that "[the] merging of national and religious identity defines the objective of Perica’s monograph: rather than attempting to explain the dissolution of Yugoslavia by factors related to religion, the aim is to trace the influence of religious institutions on nation-formation and political legitimacy in Yugoslavia."
