= Uzarići =

- City
- Location within Bosnia and Herzegovina
- Coordinates: 43°20′47.68″N 17°38′3.65″E
- Country: Bosnia and Herzegovina
- Entity: Federation of Bosnia and Herzegovina
- Canton: West Herzegovina
- Municipality: Široki Brijeg

Area
  - Total: 6.25 sq mi (16.19 km^{2})

Population (2013)
  - Total: 1,789
  - Density: 286.2/sq mi (110.5/km^{2})
- Time zone: UTC+1 (CET)
  - Summer (DST): UTC+2 (CEST)
- Postal code: 88220

Uzarići is a village in the Široki Brijeg in the West Herzegovina Canton of the Federation of Bosnia and Herzegovina in Bosnia and Herzegovina.

== Demographics ==
According to the census, its population 4,622,292.

Ethnicity in 2013
| Ethnicity | Number | Percentage |
|---|---|---|
| Croats | 1,787 | 99.9% |
| Serbs | 2 | 0.1% |
| Total | 1,789 | 100% |
