= Badija =

Island in Croatia

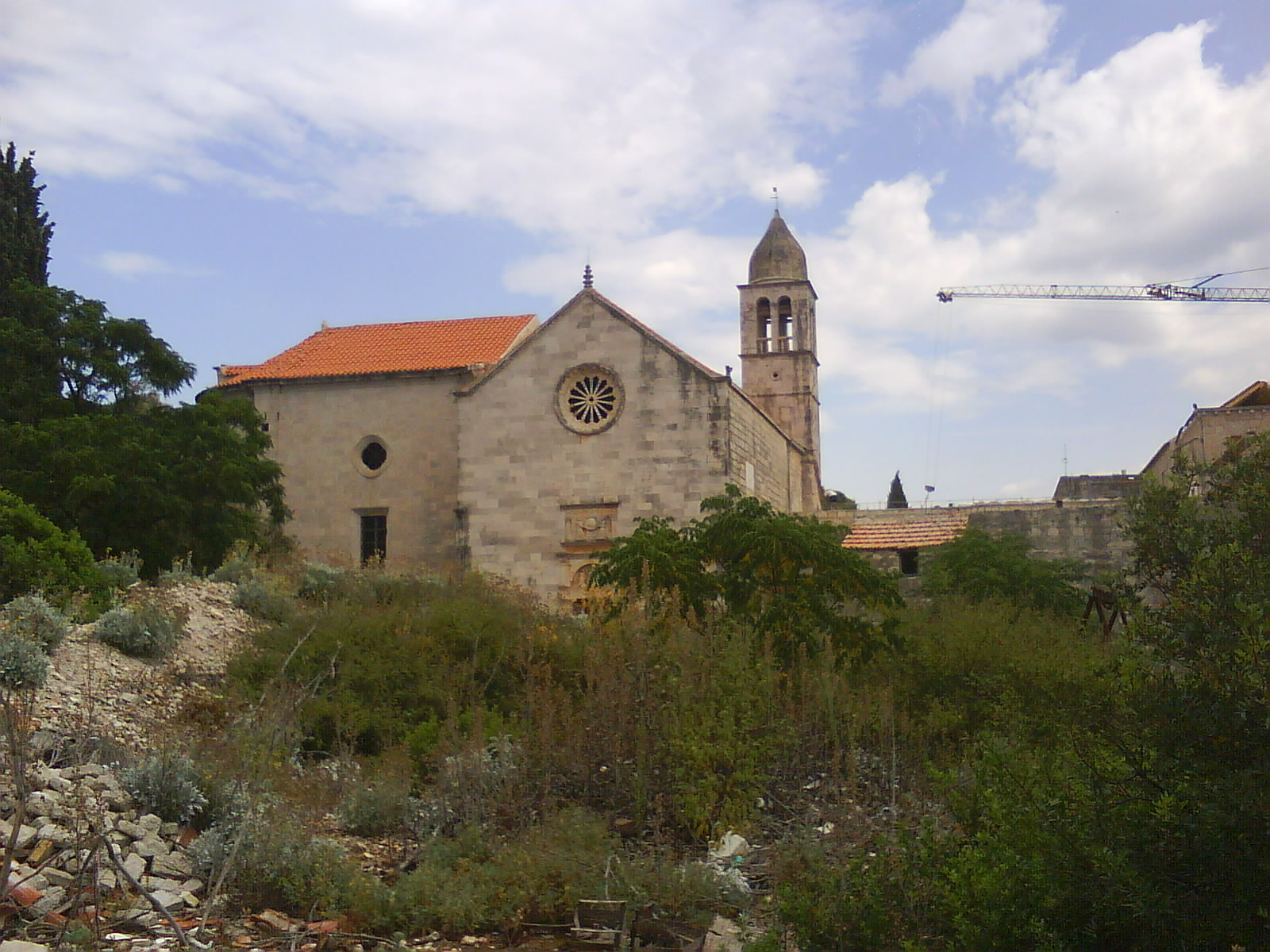
- The ancient friary on Badija

- Location within Croatia
- Interactive map of Badija

Geography
- Location: Adriatic Sea
- Coordinates: 42.9556°N 17.1611°E
- Archipelago: Škoji
- Area: 0.97 km^{2} (0.37 sq mi)

Administration
- Croatia
- County: Dubrovnik-Neretva County

Demographics
- Population: 0 (2011)

Badija is the largest island in the Škoji archipelago, near the island of Korčula in Croatia.

The island is currently unpopulated. Franciscan friars from Bosnia came into possession of it in 1398 and established a friary which still stands. Under their possession, the island was known as the Rock of St. Peter.

The friars held possession of the island until 1949, when it was expropriated by the communist state government.

== Sources ==
- Samostan Uznesenja B. D. Marije (in Croatian)
