= Joe Tripician =

American film producer

Joseph Tripician
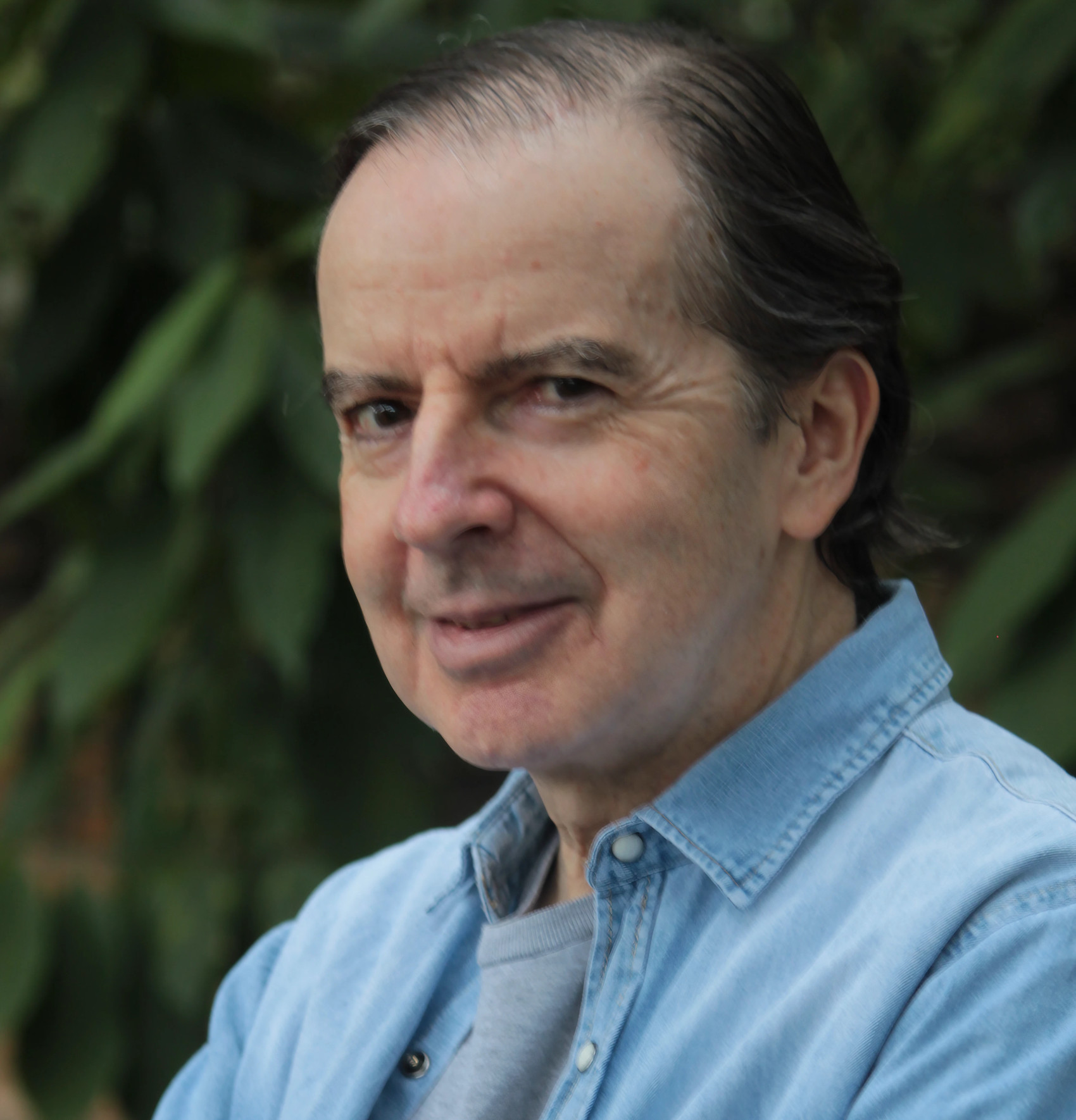
- Occupations: Producer; writer; screenwriter; film director; playwright; songwriter
- Years active: 1970–present
- Spouse: Cecilia Tripician (m. 1999)
- Children: 2: Helena Tripician, Olivia Tripician

Joseph Tripician, also known as Joe Trip, is an American producer, writer, screenwriter, film director, songwriter, playwright and performer. He is best known for the documentaries Borders and Metaphoria, and his memoir Balkanized at Sunrise, based on his 1997 journey to the Balkans.

== 1980s – Music videos, Borders and other documentaries ==
In 1980, Tripician edited the documentary Memories of Duke, directed by Gary Keys and based on the biography of composer, pianist, and bandleader Duke Ellington. At the same time, he wrote and directed the short film Shrapnel Training Course, a parody infomercial satirizing the CIA. From 1979 to 1981 Tripician produced video recordings of live performances of over 100 different bands at the New York City nightclub Hurrah.

Later, Tripician produced and co-directed several musical videos included in a compilation called Danspak, which was distributed by Sony Video Software and released in three parts (1982, 1984 and 1986). The videos included "Hip Hop, Be Bop (Don't Stop)," by Man Parrish, "Pointy Head Gear," by Shöx Lumania, "Jimmy, Gimme Your Love," by Michael Musto & The Must, and "Alien Girl," by Richard Bone, in 1982; "I've Got A Right," by The Lenny Kaye Connection, and "Sweet Jane," a cover of The Velvet Underground's song performed by The Jim Carroll Band, in 1984 (that video featured a cameo appearance of the late songwriter Lou Reed); "Grace," by The Ordinaires, "Skintight Tina," by Prince Charles Alexander, and "Buttercup," by Stevie Wonder and performed by Carl Anderson, both released in 1985.

In 1984, Tripician and his partner Merrill Aldighieri were listed in the Rolling Stone Book of Rock Video as one of the twenty top video directors in the world.

== 1990s – Metaphoria, aliens and "Ozark Melody" with Jeff Buckley ==
In 1997, Tripician's paperback book the Official Alien Abductee's Handbook was published by Andrews and McMeel. It was the inspiration for Melodies for Abductees, a pop album which included the novelty song "Ozark Melody," composed by Tripician, Frederick Reed, and songwriter Jeff Buckley, who also sang and performed guitar and mandolin on it.

Tripician also co-directed with Jakov Sedlar the feature documentary Tudjman, narrated by actor Martin Sheen and based on the biography of Croatian president Franjo Tudjman. Later that year, Tripician traveled to the Balkans, after being hired by the Croatian government to write Tudjman's official biography. The working title of that book was In Tito's Shadow. After granting Tripician editorial control of the book and receiving the complete manuscript, the content caused a controversy within the Tudjman government, and the book was summarily banned.

In May 2002, Tripician performed his one-man play Balkanized at Sunrise at Dixon Place Theater in New York City. It was based on his 1997 trip to the Balkans. He subsequently published his story in a memoir of the same name.

== 2000s – From Balkanized at Sunrise to Honeymoon in Oak Ridge ==
In 2016, Tripician began developing a feature film project titled Team Joy with Tony Award-nominated actor Jesse Williams.

In 2021, Tripician won the monthly London International Screenwriting Competition in September for his script President Zappa. That year, his screenplay was also included in the "Hot 100 Winners" list at the Capital Fund Screenplay Competition. President Zappa is a comedic and dramatic biopic that imagines what would happen if the rockstar Frank Zappa ran for the U.S. presidency and won. According to Tripician, "In the script, Frank discovers that he must bend his principles in order to win the Presidency so he can enact policies that benefit many people who are in need. However, he pays a price for his compromises and regrets doing them."

In December 2023, Tripician completed the documentary Honeymoon in Oak Ridge. The film follows him on a personal journey as he travels with his parents to Oak Ridge, Tennessee, where they worked, unknowingly, to create the first atomic bombs. Interwoven with their journey are candid reflections from Tripician's wife and daughters, examining how the legacy of the Manhattan Project resonates across generations. In 2024, the film won the Jury Award for Best Short Documentary at the Uranium International Film Festival. The film was screened at various cities around the world including Asheville (TN), Chicago (IL), Las Vegas (NV), Rio de Janeiro (Brazil), Seville (Spain) and Berlin (Germany). Honeymoon in Oak Ridge was distributed by Alexander Street and Docsville (Lightning International/Asia Satellite Telecommunications).

In 2024, Tripician was named one of the top ten finalists at the 2024 Cinequest Film Festival for his dramatic teleplay Jenny Appleseed. It is a contemporary story about a headstrong teen who has her life turned upside down when she tries to help someone who needs abortion pills in a state where they are illegal.

== Awards and nominations ==
Year	Award	For	Result
1984	Top 20 Music Video Directors Worldwide	Rolling Stone Book of Rock Video	Won
1991	Chicago International Film Festival	Metaphoria	Won
1991	The Montreal International Film Festival	Metaphoria	Won
1991	The Sinking Creek Film Festival	Metaphoria	Won
1991	Cyber Arts Festival Los Angeles	Metaphoria	Won
1992	Chicago/Midwest Emmy	Metaphoria	Won
2007	Big Apple Film Festival	The Student	
2007	Nevada City Film Festival	The Student	
2007	Dallas VideoFest	The Student	
2014	Williamsburg International Film Festival	A Pizza Chegou (Pizza Run)	
2014	El Ojo Cojo Film Festival	A Pizza Chegou (Pizza Run)	
2014	Dallas VideoFest	A Pizza Chegou (Pizza Run)	
2018	Dallas VideoFest	Meeting Carol	
2021	London International Screenwriting Competition	President Zappa	Won
2021	Capital Fund Screenplay Competition	President Zappa	Won
2023	Shore Scripts Film Fund Spring	The Gringo in the Hammock	Won
2024	Cinequest Film Festival	Jenny Appleseed	Won
2024	Uranium Film Festival	Honeymoon in Oak Ridge	Won

== Filmography ==
Film
Year	Title	Role	Notes
1980	Memories of Duke	Editor	
1980	Shrapnel Training Course	Writer/director	
1988	The Kissing Booth	Producer/editor/co-director	
1989	Borders	Writer/producer/editor/co-director	
1980	The Gun is Loaded	Director	
1991	Metaphoria	Writer/producer/editor/co-director	
1991	The Wall Street Journal Report	Editor	
1993	Motel Blue 19	Producer/editor/co-director	
1993	The War Room	Director of graphics and animation	
1995	The Conspiracy of Silence	On-line editor	
1997	Tudjman	Co-director	
1999	Marty: The Martin Scorsese Story	Actor	
2007	The Student	Writer/producer/editor/director	
2009	Kitchen Sink Stories	Writer/editor/director	
2013	A Pizza Chegou (Pizza Run)	Writer/producer/editor/director	
2018	Meeting Carol	Writer/producer/editor/director	
2024	Honeymoon in Oak Ridge	Writer/producer/editor/director	

== Books ==
- 2016: Chats from Beyond: Stories to amuse, frighten and disturb.
- 2013: Obras Seleccionadas: Volumen 1 (Joe Tripician – Selected Works: Volume 1).
- 2012: My Night with Sarah Palin and Other Disturbing Stories.
- 1997: The Official Alien Abductee's Handbook.
