= Paul Hockenos =

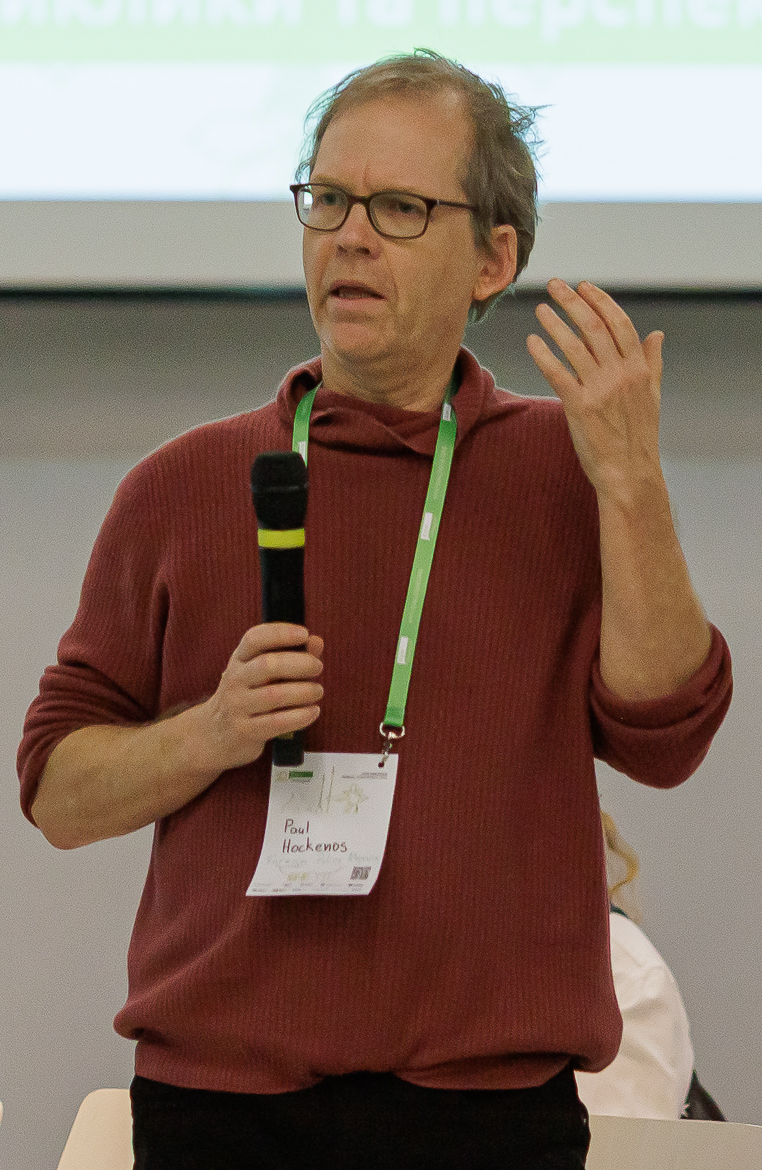
Paul Hockenos (2025)

Paul Hockenos (born 1963) is a Berlin- and New York–based writer and political analyst who has been working in Germany and across Central and Eastern Europe since 1989. His work has appeared in The New York Times, Newsweek, The Nation, Foreign Policy, the New Statesman, The Christian Science Monitor and The Chronicle of Higher Education, among other periodicals. He has authored several books on European politics.

== Biography ==
Hockenos grew up near Skidmore College, in Saratoga Springs, NY, where his father, Warren Hockenos, was a professor of philosophy. He earned a BA in political science from Skidmore in 1985, then traveled to Germany and, for a time, studied political science at the Free University, in West Berlin. Subsequently, he completed a master's degree in social and political thought at the University of Sussex, England. In the summer of 1989, while hitchhiking to Budapest, he observed how masses of East Germans were crossing the border from Communist-controlled Hungary into Austria (one of the turns of events leading up to the fall of the Berlin Wall); his writing about what he witnessed marked the beginning of his journalistic career.

In one of his most recent books, Berlin Calling: A Story of Anarchy, Music, the Wall, and the Birth of the New Berlin, published by the New Press in 2017, he writes about the history of Berlin's musical and political underground since the late 1960s.
