= Vjekoslav Perica =

Croatian historian

- Born: Vjekoslav Perica; 11 July 1955 (age 71); Split
- Occupations: Historian, journalist and writer
- Writing career
- Subject: Modern history of religion in former Yugoslavia
- Notable work: Balkan Idols: Religion and Nationalism in Yugoslav States
- Notable awards: Fulbright Scholar

Vjekoslav Perica (born 11 July 1955) is a Croatian historian, journalist and writer who specializes in the modern history of religions in the former Yugoslavia.

== Biography ==
In his youth, Perica was a basketball player who was a member of KK Jugoplastika's first team, but ultimately found academic pursuit more important than his sports career. He graduated from the Faculty of Law in Split in 1980.

From 1985 to 1990 Perica was employed as the secretary of the government's Committee for Relations with Religious Communities. From 1988 to 1991 he wrote a column in Nedjeljna Dalmacija called "Religion and Politics", and interviewed virtually all religious leaders in the former Yugoslavia.

After being fired from his job in 1990, Perica went to the United States where he obtained a MSc in political science (1994) and history (1995), as well as a PhD in history (1998), all from the University of Minnesota. His PhD thesis, "Religious revival and ethnic mobilization in Yugoslavia, 1965–1991: A history of the Yugoslav religious question from the reform era to the civil war", won him awards from both the United States Institute of Peace and the Harry Frank Guggenheim Foundation. From 1999 to 2007 he worked as a visiting lecturer on a number of American universities.

Perica is the author of the book Balkan Idols: Religion and Nationalism in Yugoslav States (New York: Oxford University Press, 2002). He is a former Research Fellow at the Woodrow Wilson International Center for Scholars and the United States Institute of Peace. In 2007 Perica was a U.S. Fulbright scholar in Belgrade, Serbia.

A two-volume Serbian translation of Balkan Idols, revised and expanded with a new introduction, was published by Biblioteka XX vek from Belgrade in 2006. In 2011/2012 he held fellowship at the Netherlands Institute for Advanced Studies in Humanities and Social Science in Wassenaar, The Netherlands. His most recent book is coauthored with Mitja Velikonja [University of Ljubljana] entitled "Nebeska Jugoslavija. Interakcije političkih mitologija i pop-kulture" published by Biblioteka XX vek, Belgrade 2012 Perica is Professor of history at the University of Rijeka, Croatia. He lives in USA and Croatia.

== Published works ==
- Balkan Idols. Religion and Nationalism in Yugoslav States, New York and Oxford, Oxford University Press, 2002. ISBN 0-19-517429-1
- Balkanski idoli. Religija i nacionalizam u jugoslovenskim državama. 1–2. Revised and expanded edition with a new foreword by the author. Translated to Serbian by Slobodanka Glišić and Slavica Miletić; Belgrade, Serbia; Biblioteka xx. vek, 2006. ISBN 86-7562-052-7
- Mitovi nacionalizma i demokratija (with Darko Gavrilovic, Ljubiša Despotovic and Srdan Šljukic); Novi Sad, Serbia; Center for History, Democracy and Reconciliation, Faculty for European Political and Legal Studies, Grafomarketing; 2009. ISBN 86-86601-07-3
- Sveti Petar i Sveti Sava: Sakralni simboli kao metafore povijesnih promjena; Belgrade, Serbia; Biblioteka XX vek, 2009. ISBN 86-7562-081-0
- Nebeska Jugoslavija: interakcija političkih mitologija i pop-kulture; Belgrade, Serbia; Biblioteka XX vek, 2012. ISBN 86-7562-107-8

== Sources ==
- Vjekoslav Perica at the Who is Who in Croatian Science
