= AQ =

AQ, Aq, aQ, or aq may refer to:

== Arts, entertainment and media ==
- A. Q. Shipley (Allan Quay Shipley, born 1986), known as AQ, American former football center and coach
- A-Q (born 1986), Nigerian rapper
- AQ Interactive, a Japanese video game developer
- AdventureQuest, a 2002 Web-based game
- Australian Quarterly, a journal for political science
- Ah Q or A Q, a character in 1921 novella The True Story of Ah Q
- Al-Qatala, a fictional group in the Call of Duty: Modern Warfare video game series

== Businesses and organizations ==
- 9 Air, China (IATA:AQ)
- Acquity Group, US (NYSE:AQ)
- Alliance Quebec, Canada
- Aloha Airlines, a defunct US airline (IATA:AQ)
- Al-Qaeda, an Islamist militant group
- Al-Quds Force, a Iran special forces
- Automatic Qualifying conference, in North American college sports

== Chemistry ==
- 8-Aminoquinoline (AQ), a heterocyclic bidentate ligand
- Anthraquinone (AQ), an aromatic organic compound
- Aqueous solution (aq), dissolved in water

== Computing and telephony ==
- .aq, the Internet domain for Antarctica
- Adaptive quantization, a quantization process that provides efficient compression
- Oracle Advanced Queuing, a message provider used in the software products of the Oracle Corporation

== Places ==
- Ak, Buin Zahra, also spelled Aq, a village in Iran
- Antarctica (ISO 3166:AQ)
- Academic Quadrangle, at Simon Fraser University, Burnaby, Canada
- American Samoa (DIA 65-18 / FIPS PUB 10-4:AQ)
- Antigua and Barbuda, LOC MARC code
- L'Aquila, a province of Italy

== Psychology ==
- Attribution Questionnaire, a tool to assess mental illness stigma
- Adversity quotient, the ability to overcome adversities
- Autism-spectrum quotient, an adult test for autism spectrum disorder

== Unit of measure ==
- Aq, or inch of water, a unit of pressure

== See also ==
- AQA (disambiguation)
- Aqua (disambiguation)
- Ei-Q (1911–1960), photographer
- QA (disambiguation)
