= Ademuz (buildings) =

Building in Valencia Province, Spain

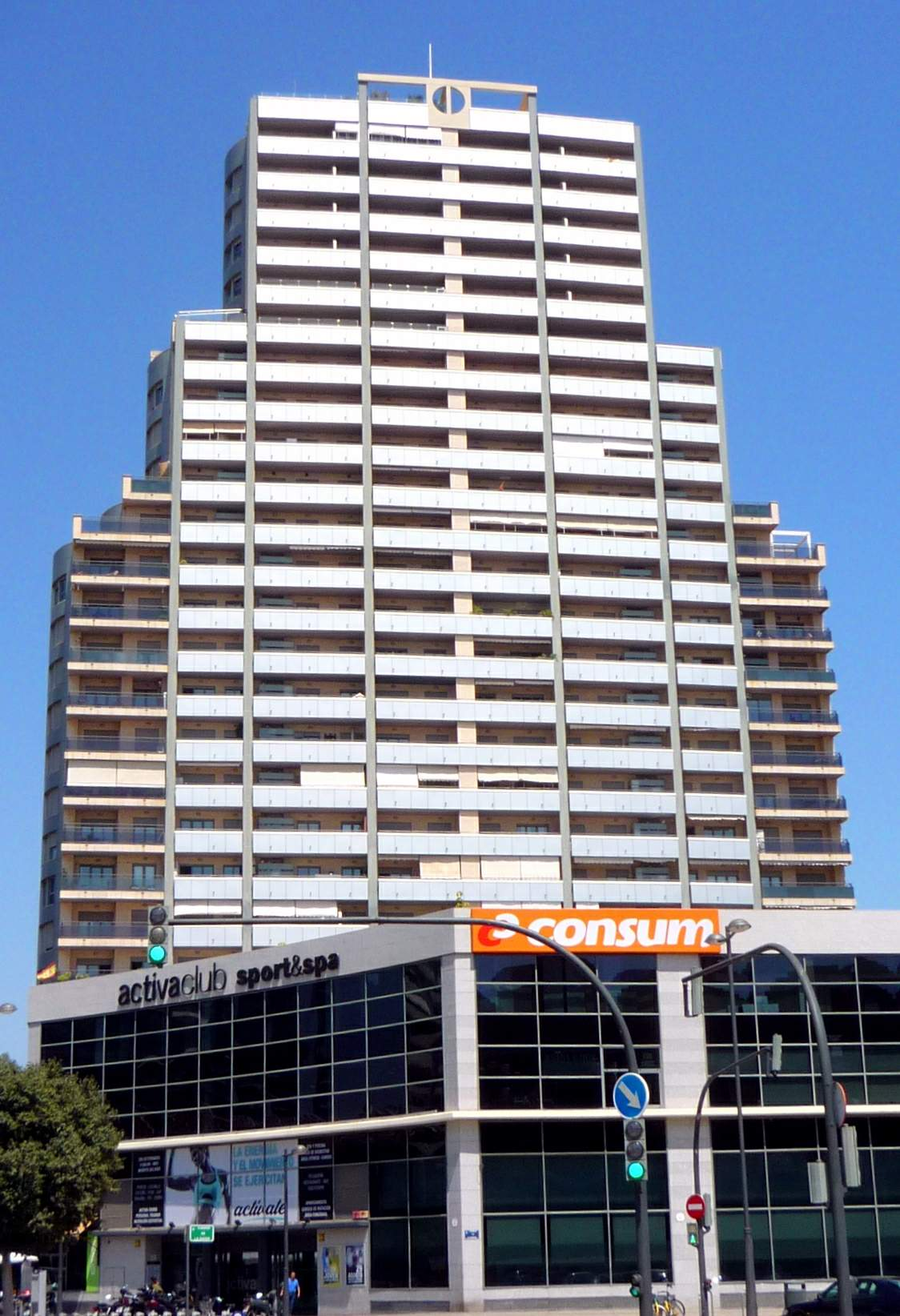
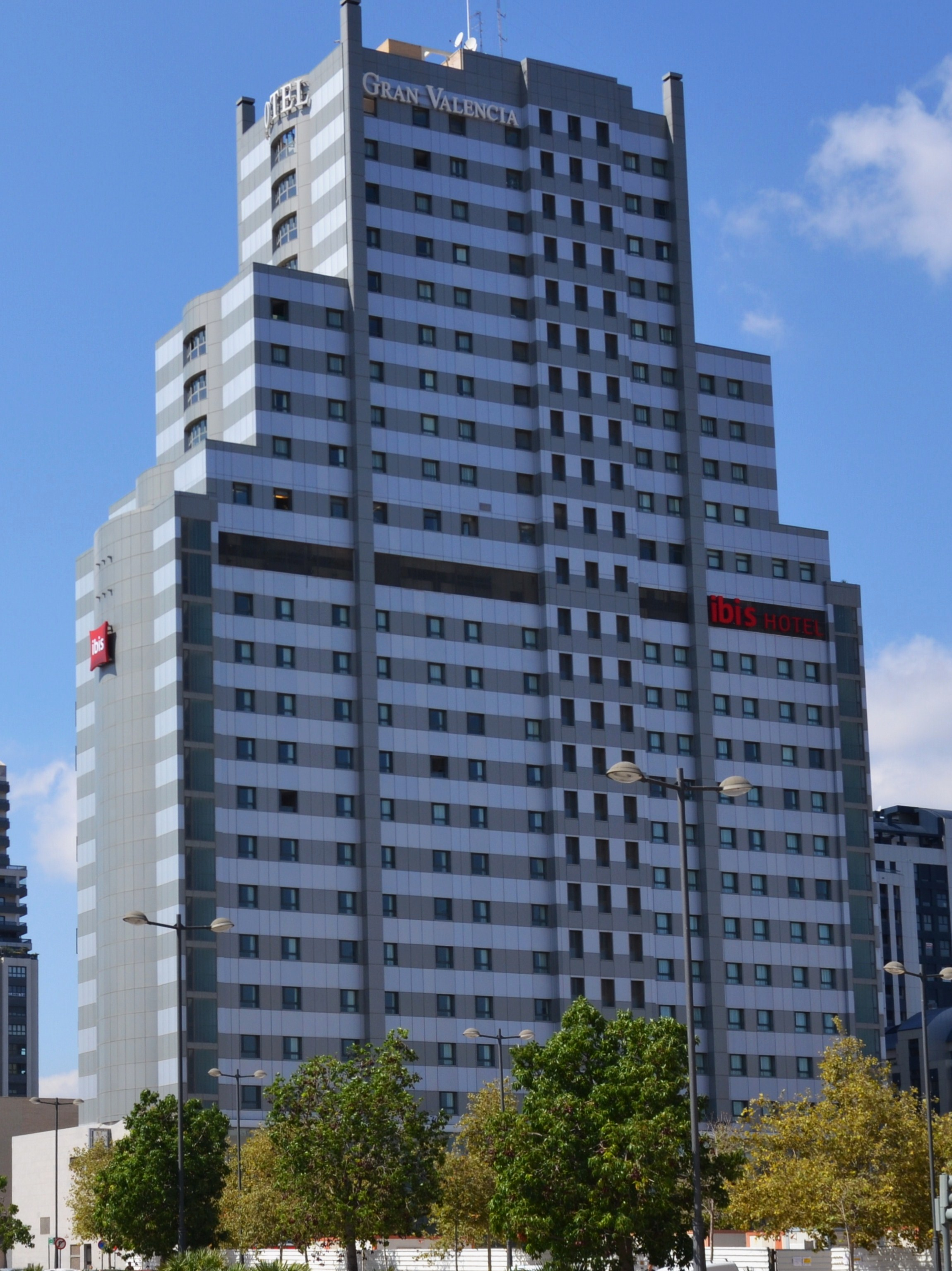
- Ademuz 1 (left) and Ademuz 2 (right)

General information
- Status: Completed
- Type: residential - Ademuz 1 hotel - Ademuz 2
- Location: Valencia, Spain
- Completed: 2003

Height
- Height: 90 m (295 ft)

Technical details
- Floor count: 26 - Ademuz 1; 24 - Ademuz 2

Ademuz is the complex of twin skyscrapers Ademuz 1 and Ademuz 2. They are located in Valencia, Spain. Completed in 2003, Ademuz 1 has 26 floors, Ademuz 2 has 24 floors, and both have a height 90 metres. These are some of the tallest buildings in the city, lower than Hilton Valencia, Torre de Francia, Aqua Multiespacio; have the same height as the very similar Torres Llaves de Oro. Ademuz 1 is residential building, Ademuz 1 is hotel.

== See also ==
- List of tallest buildings in Valencia
