= Torres Llaves de Oro =

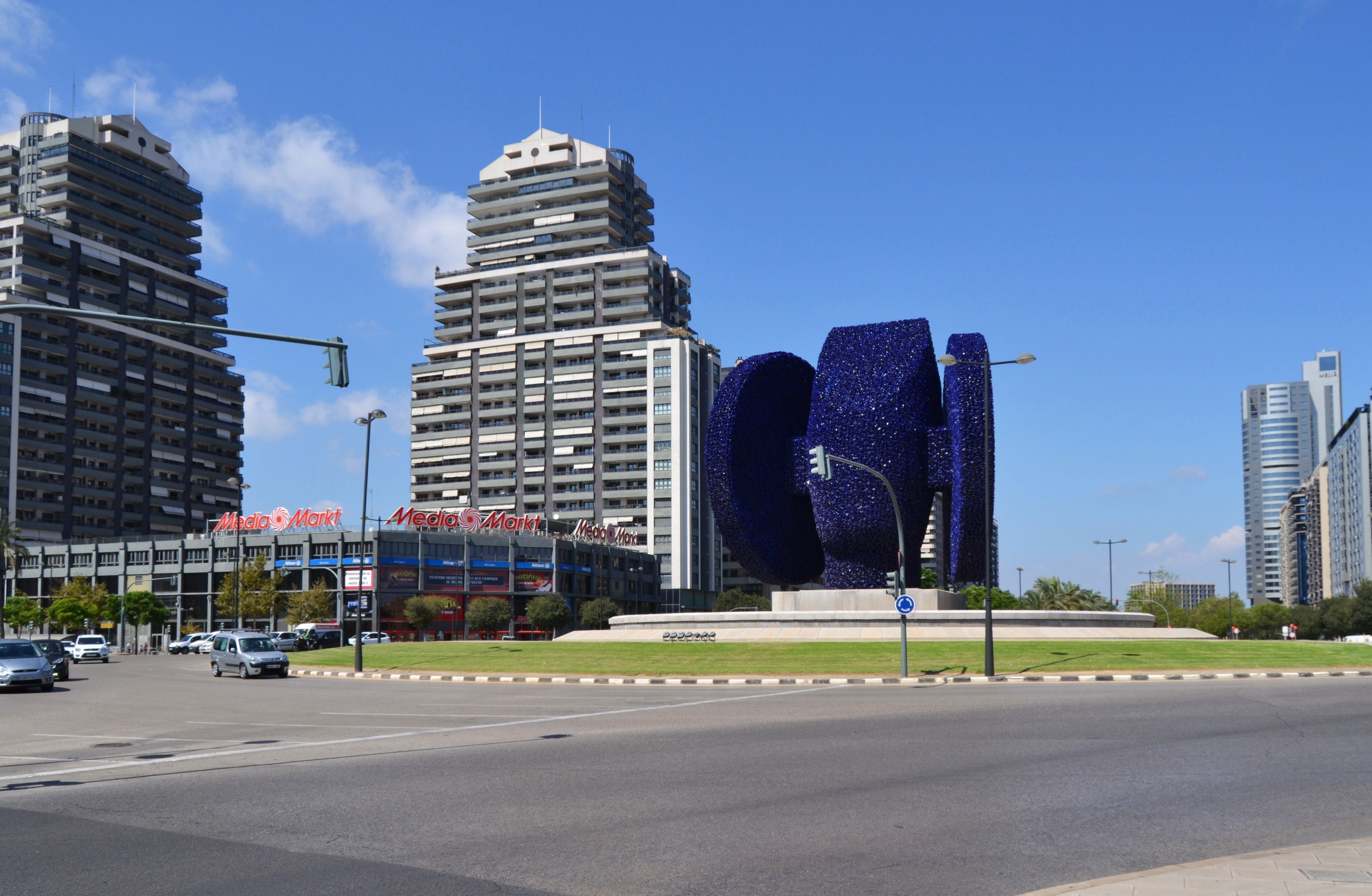

General information
- Status: Completed
- Type: residential
- Location: Valencia, Spain
- Completed: 2003

Height
- Height: 90 m (295 ft)

Technical details
- Floor count: 26

Torres Llaves de Oro is the complex of twin skyscrapers Torre Llaves de Oro 1 and Torre Llaves de Oro 2. They are located in Valencia, Spain. Completed in 2003, has 26 floors and rises 90 metres. These are some of the tallest buildings in the city, lower than Hilton Valencia, Torre de Francia, Aqua Multiespacio; have the same height as the very similar Ademuz buildings.

== See also ==
- List of tallest buildings in Valencia
