= Beryl =

Gemstone: beryllium aluminium silicate

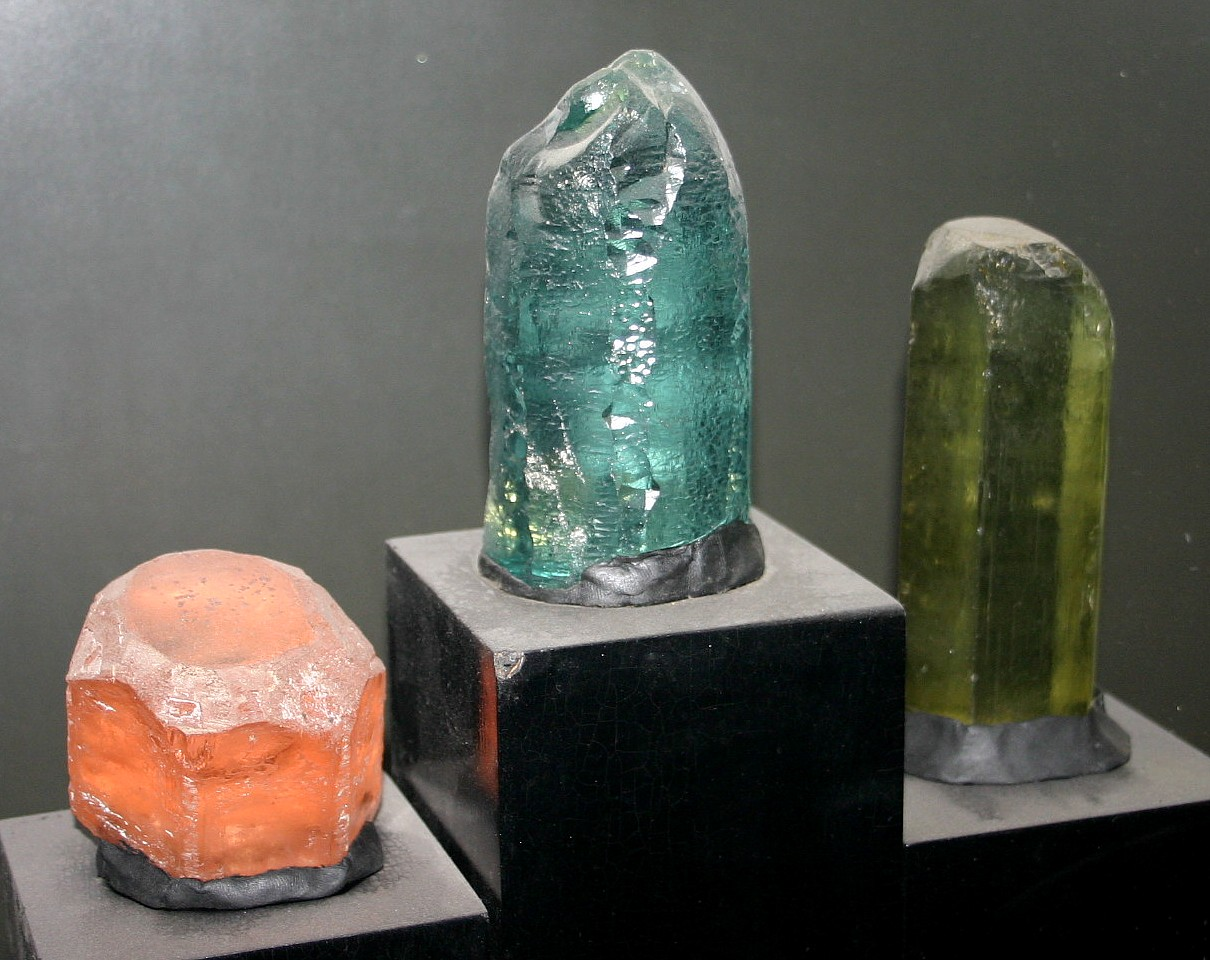
- Three varieties of beryl (left to right): morganite, aquamarine and emerald

General
- Category: Cyclosilicate
- Formula: Be_{3}Al_{2}(SiO_{3})_{6}
- IMA symbol: Brl
- Strunz classification: 9.CJ.05
- Crystal system: Hexagonal
- Crystal class: Dihexagonal dipyramidal (6/mmm); H-M symbol: (6/m 2/m 2/m)
- Space group: P6/mcc
- Unit cell: a = 9.21 Å, c = 9.19 Å; Z = 2

Identification
- Formula mass: 537.50 g/mol
- Color: Green, blue, yellow, colorless, pink, and others
- Crystal habit: Prismatic to tabular crystals; radial, columnar; granular to compact massive
- Twinning: Rare
- Cleavage: Imperfect on {0001}
- Fracture: Conchoidal to irregular
- Tenacity: Brittle
- Mohs scale hardness: 7.5–8.0
- Luster: Vitreous to resinous
- Streak: White
- Diaphaneity: Transparent to translucent
- Specific gravity: 2.63–2.92
- Optical properties: Uniaxial (−)
- Refractive index: n_{ω} = 1.564–1.595 n_{ε} = 1.568–1.602
- Birefringence: δ = 0.0040–0.0070
- Pleochroism: Weak to distinct
- Ultraviolet fluorescence: None (some fracture-filling materials used to improve emerald's clarity do fluoresce, but the stone itself does not). Morganite has weak violet fluorescence.

Beryl (/ˈbɛrəl/ BERR-əl) is a mineral composed of beryllium aluminium silicate with the chemical formula Be_{3}Al_{2}(SiO_{3})_{6}. Well-known varieties of beryl include emerald and aquamarine. Naturally occurring hexagonal crystals of beryl can be up to several meters in size, but terminated crystals are relatively rare. Pure beryl is colorless, but it is frequently tinted by impurities; possible colors are green, blue, yellow, pink, and red (the rarest). It is an ore source of beryllium.

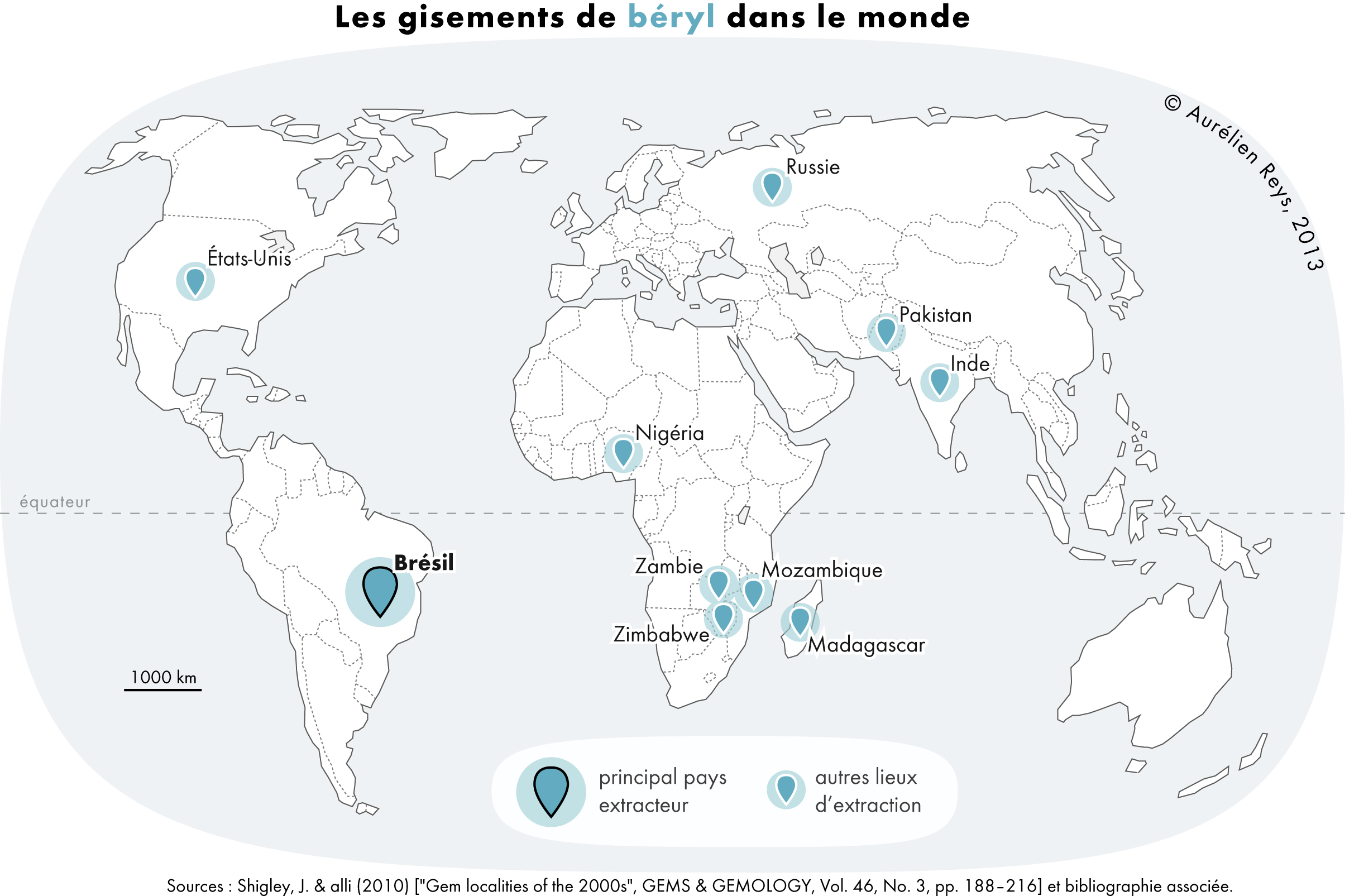
Main beryl producing countries

== Etymology ==
The word beryl – Middle English: beril – is borrowed, via Old French: beryl and Latin: beryllus, from Ancient Greek βήρυλλος bḗryllos, which referred to various blue-green stones, from Prakrit veruḷiya, veḷuriya 'beryl' (Note: Compare veruḷiya and veḷuriya to the pseudo-Sanskritization वैडूर्य vaiḍūrya, meaning either "cat's eye" (gem), generic "jewel", or "lapis lazuli" (gem). The folk etymology explains the gem name as meaning "[brought] from [the city of] Vidūra".) which is ultimately of Dravidian origin, maybe from the name of Belur or Velur, a town in Karnataka, southern India. The term was later adopted for the mineral beryl more exclusively.

When the first eyeglasses were constructed in 13th-century Italy, the lenses were made of beryl (or of rock crystal) as glass could not be made clear enough. Consequently, glasses were named Brille in German (bril in Dutch and briller in Danish).

== Deposits ==
Beryl is a common mineral, and it is widely distributed in nature. It is found most commonly in granitic pegmatites, but also occurs in mica schists, such as those of the Ural Mountains, and in limestone in Colombia. It is less common in ordinary granite and is only infrequently found in nepheline syenite. Beryl is often associated with tin and tungsten ore bodies formed as high-temperature hydrothermal veins. In granitic pegmatites, beryl is found in association with quartz, potassium feldspar, albite, muscovite, biotite, and tourmaline. Beryl is sometimes found in metasomatic contacts of igneous intrusions with gneiss, schist, or carbonate rocks. Common beryl, mined as beryllium ore, is found in small deposits in many countries, but the main producers are Russia, Brazil, and the United States.

New England's pegmatites have produced some of the largest beryls found, including one massive crystal from the Bumpus Quarry in Albany, Maine with dimensions 5.5 by 1.2 m (18.0 by 3.9 ft) with a mass of around 18 tonnes (20 short tons); it is New Hampshire's state mineral. As of 1999, the world's largest known naturally occurring crystal of any mineral is a crystal of beryl from Malakialina, Madagascar, 18 m (59 ft) long and 3.5 m (11 ft) in diameter, and weighing 380,000 kg (840,000 lb).

== Crystal habit and structure ==
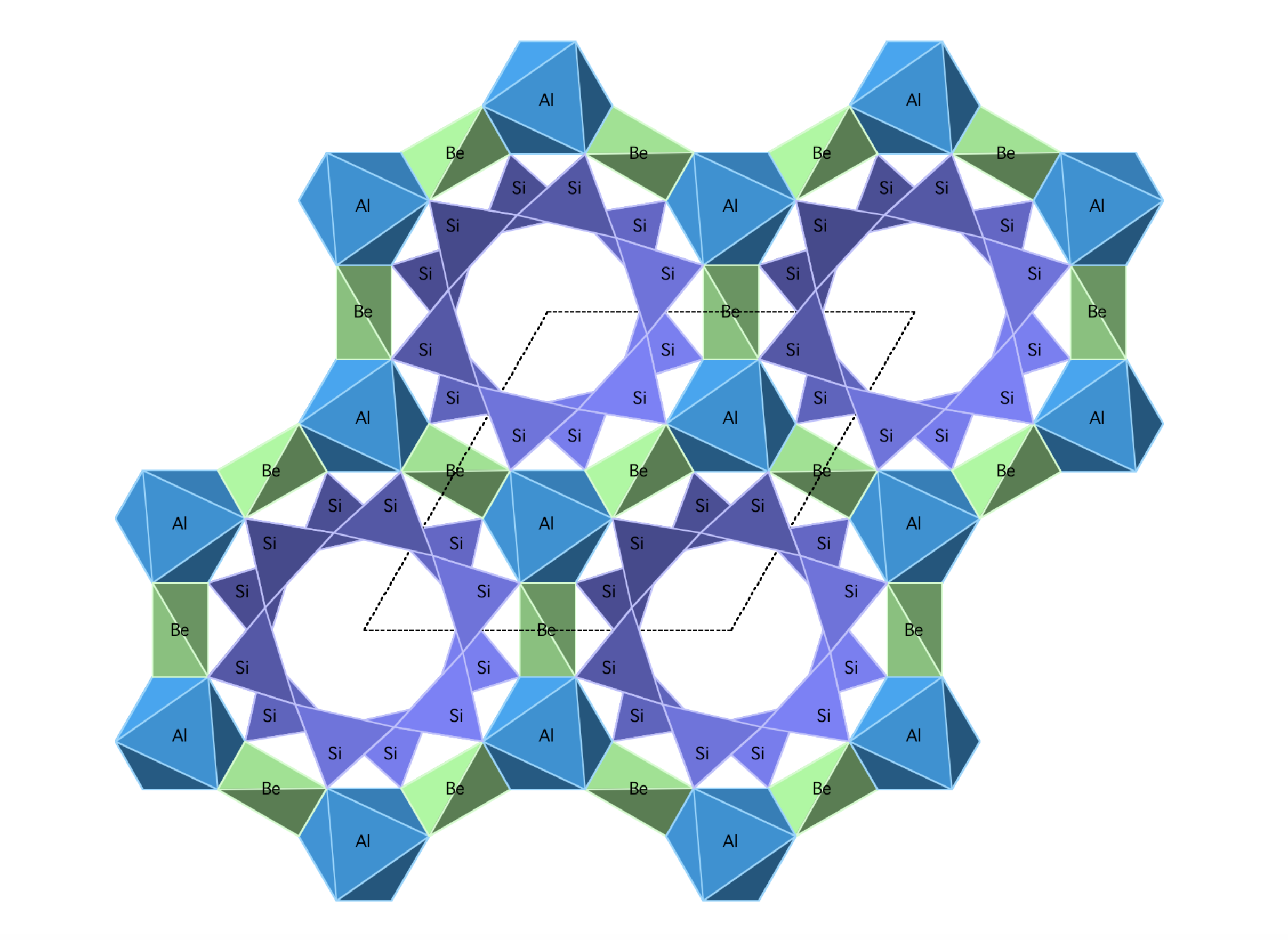
Beryl crystal structure with view down C axis

Beryl belongs to the hexagonal crystal system. Normally beryl forms hexagonal columns but can also occur in massive habits. As a cyclosilicate beryl incorporates rings of silicate tetrahedra of SiO_{3}–O (the connected O is from another SiO_{3}) that are arranged in columns along the C axis and as parallel layers perpendicular to the C axis, forming channels along the C axis. These channels permit a variety of ions, neutral atoms, and molecules to be incorporated into the crystal thus disrupting the overall charge of the crystal permitting further substitutions in aluminium, silicon, and beryllium sites in the crystal structure. These impurities give rise to the variety of colors of beryl that can be found. Increasing alkali content within the silicate ring channels causes increases to the refractive indices and birefringence.

== Human health impact ==
Beryl is a beryllium compound that is a known carcinogen with acute toxic effects leading to pneumonitis when inhaled. Care must thus be used when mining, handling, and refining these gems.

== Varieties ==
=== Aquamarine and maxixe ===
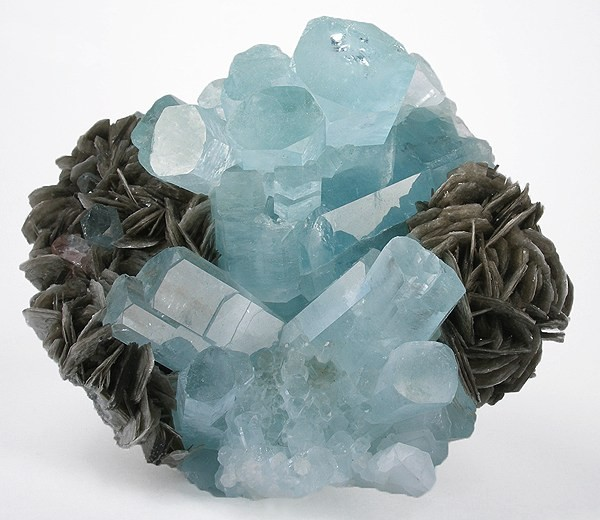
Aquamarine

Aquamarine (from Latin: aqua marina, "sea water") is a blue or cyan variety of beryl. It occurs at most localities which yield ordinary beryl. The gem-gravel placer deposits of Sri Lanka contain aquamarine. Green-yellow beryl, such as that occurring in Brazil, is sometimes called chrysolite aquamarine. The deep blue version of aquamarine is called maxixe (pronounced mah-she-she). Its color results from a radiation-induced color center.

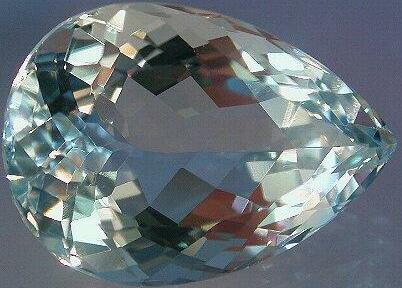
Faceted aquamarine

The pale blue color of aquamarine is attributed to Fe^{2+}. Fe^{3+} ions produce golden-yellow color, and when both Fe^{2+} and Fe^{3+} are present, the color is a darker blue as in maxixe. Decoloration of maxixe by light or heat thus may be due to the charge transfer between Fe^{3+} and Fe^{2+}.

In the United States, aquamarines can be found at the summit of Mount Antero in the Sawatch Range in central Colorado, and in the New England and North Carolina pegmatites. Aquamarines are also present in the state of Wyoming, aquamarine has been discovered in the Big Horn Mountains, near Powder River Pass. Another location within the United States is the Sawtooth Range near Stanley, Idaho, although the minerals are within a wilderness area which prevents collecting. In Brazil, there are mines in the states of Minas Gerais, Espírito Santo, and Bahia, and minorly in Rio Grande do Norte. The mines of Colombia, Skardu Pakistan, Madagascar, Russia, Namibia, Zambia, Malawi, Tanzania, and Kenya also produce aquamarine.

=== Emerald ===
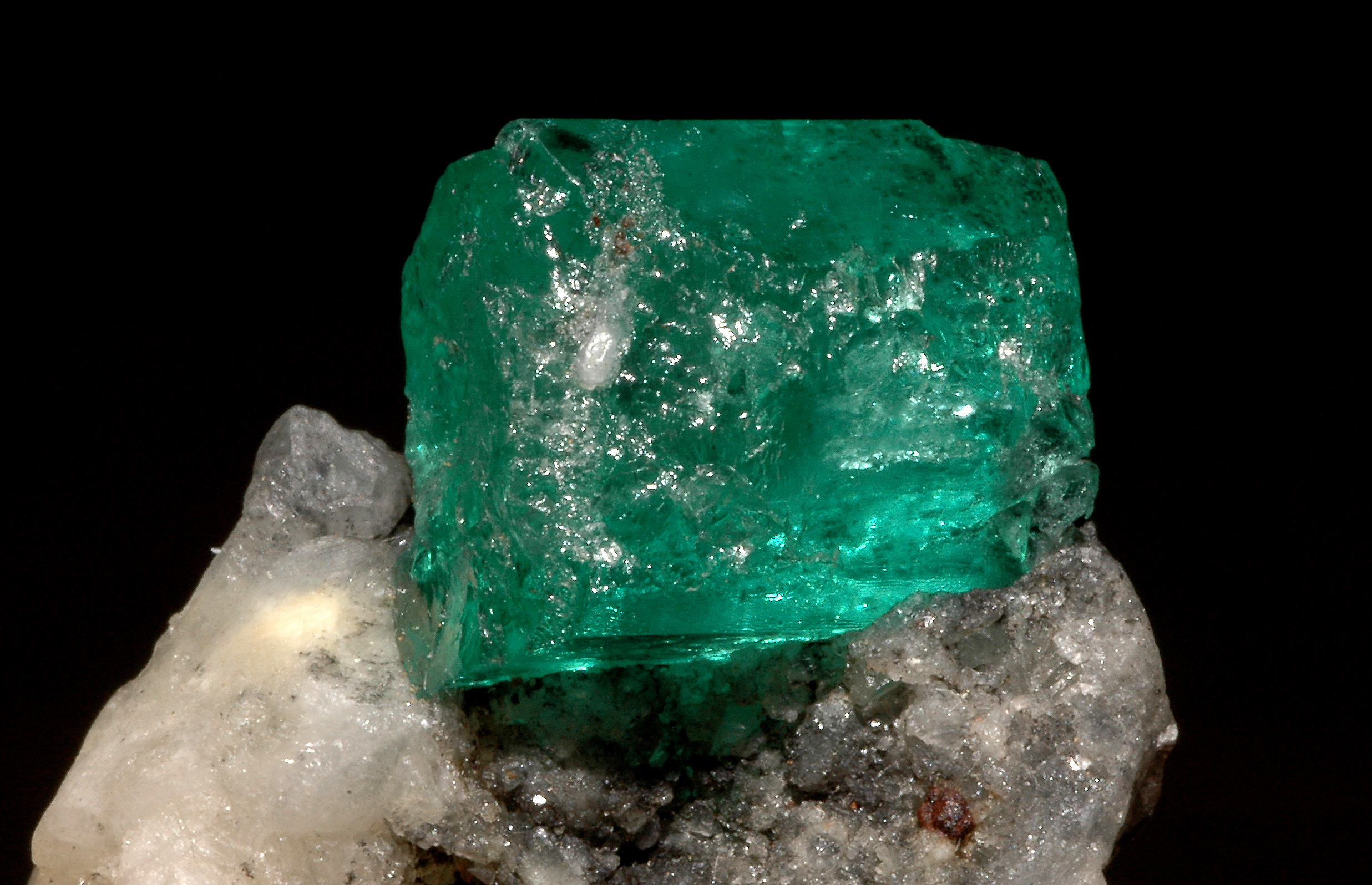
Rough emerald on matrix

Emerald is green beryl, colored by around 2% chromium and sometimes vanadium. Most emeralds are highly included, so their brittleness (resistance to breakage) is classified as generally poor.

The modern English word "emerald" comes via Middle English emeraude, imported from modern French via Old French ésmeraude and Medieval Latin esmaraldus, from Latin smaragdus, from Greek σμάραγδος smaragdos meaning 'green gem'. (Note: The Greek σμάραγδος (smaragdos) is used in the Semitic languages as אזמרגד, izmargad, as a loan-word meaning a precious emerald-colored stone. Greek smaragdos was used to translate the native Hebrew word ברקת, bareket, for one of the twelve listed stones in the Hoshen pectoral pendant of the Kohen HaGadol (High Priest). The word bareket is also used to mean "lightning flash". It may be related to Akkadian baraqtu, which means "emerald". In turn, the Semitic language words are possibly related to the Sanskrit word मरकत marakata, meaning "green".)

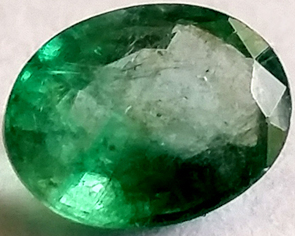
Faceted emerald, 1.07 carats (0.214 g), Colombia

Emeralds in antiquity were mined by the Egyptians and in what is now Austria, as well as Swat in contemporary Pakistan. A rare type of emerald known as a trapiche emerald is occasionally found in the mines of Colombia. A trapiche emerald exhibits a "star" pattern; it has raylike spokes of dark carbon impurities that give the emerald a six-pointed radial pattern. It is named for the trapiche, a grinding wheel used to process sugarcane in the region. Colombian emeralds are generally the most prized due to their transparency and fire. Some of the rarest emeralds come from the two main emerald belts in the Eastern Ranges of the Colombian Andes: Muzo and Coscuez west of the Altiplano Cundiboyacense, and Chivor and Somondoco to the east. Fine emeralds are also found in other countries, such as Zambia, Brazil, Zimbabwe, Madagascar, Pakistan, India, Afghanistan and Russia. In the US, emeralds can be found in Hiddenite, North Carolina. In 1998, emeralds were discovered in Yukon.

Emerald is a rare and valuable gemstone and, as such, it has provided the incentive for developing synthetic emeralds. Both hydrothermal and flux-growth synthetics have been produced. The first commercially successful emerald synthesis process was that of Carroll Chatham. The other large producer of flux emeralds was Pierre Gilson Sr., which has been on the market since 1964. Gilson's emeralds are usually grown on natural colorless beryl seeds which become coated on both sides. Growth occurs at the rate of 1 millimetre (0.039 in) per month, a typical seven-month growth run producing emerald crystals of 7 mm of thickness. The green color of emeralds is widely attributed to presence of Cr^{3+} ions. Intensely green beryls from Brazil, Zimbabwe and elsewhere in which the color is attributed to vanadium have also been sold and certified as emeralds.

=== Golden beryl and heliodor ===
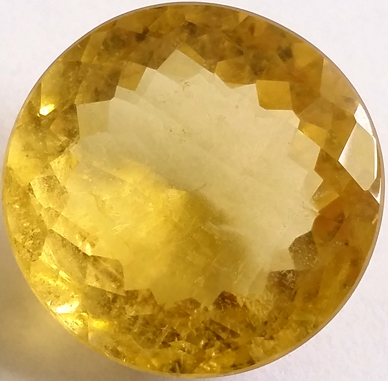
Faceted golden beryl, 48.75 carats (9.750 g), Brazil

Golden beryl can range in colors from pale yellow to a brilliant gold. Unlike emerald, golden beryl generally has very few flaws. The term "golden beryl" is sometimes synonymous with heliodor (from Greek hēlios – ἥλιος "sun" + dōron – δῶρον "gift") but golden beryl refers to pure yellow or golden yellow shades, while heliodor refers to the greenish-yellow shades. The golden yellow color is attributed to Fe^{3+} ions. Both golden beryl and heliodor are used as gems. Probably the largest cut golden beryl is the flawless 2,054-carat (410.8 g) stone on display in the Hall of Gems, Washington, D.C., United States.

=== Goshenite ===
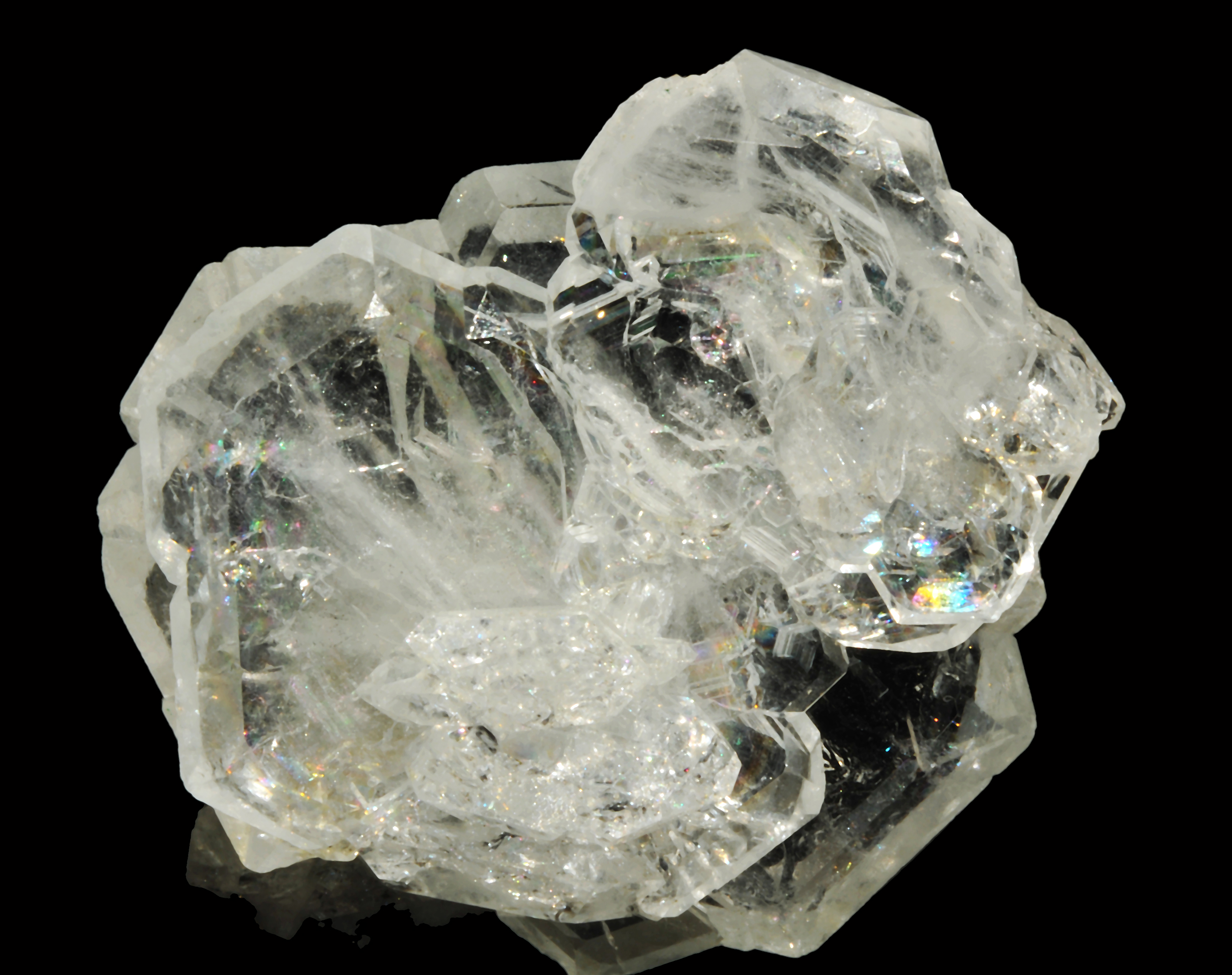
Goshenite

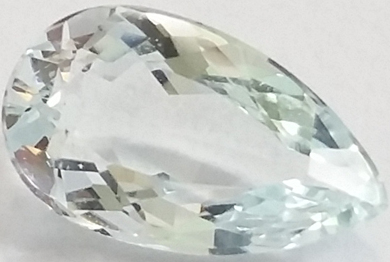
Faceted goshenite, 1.88 carats (0.376 g), Brazil

Colorless beryl is called goshenite. The name originates from Goshen, Massachusetts, where it was originally discovered. In the past, goshenite was used for manufacturing eyeglasses and lenses owing to its transparency. Nowadays, it is most commonly used for gemstone purposes.

The gem value of goshenite is relatively low. However, goshenite can be colored yellow, green, pink, blue and in intermediate colors by irradiating it with high-energy particles. The resulting color depends on the content of Ca, Sc, Ti, V, Fe, and Co impurities.

=== Morganite ===
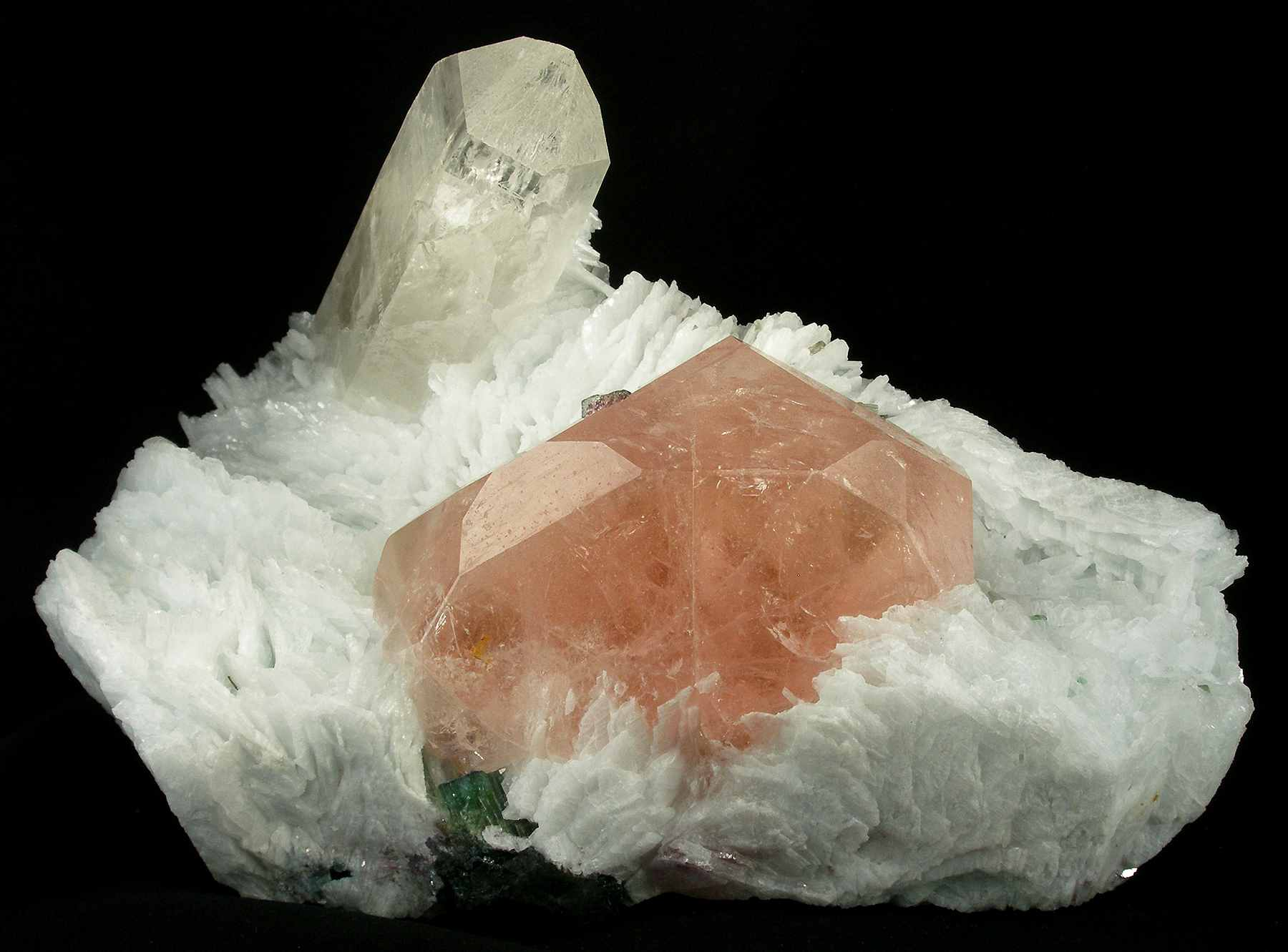
Morganite

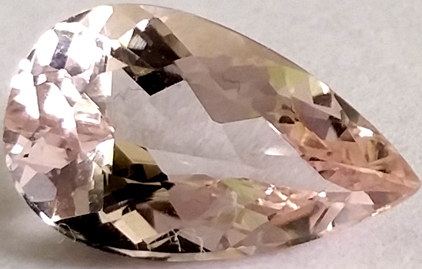
Faceted morganite, 2.01 carats (0.402 g), Brazil

Morganite, also known as "pink beryl", "rose beryl", "pink emerald" (which is not a legal term according to the new Federal Trade Commission Guidelines and Regulations), and "cesian (or caesian) beryl", is a rare light pink to rose-colored gem-quality variety of beryl. Orange/yellow varieties of morganite can also be found, and color banding is common. It can be routinely heat treated to remove patches of yellow and is occasionally treated by irradiation to improve its color. The pink color of morganite is attributed to Mn^{2+} ions.

=== Red beryl ===
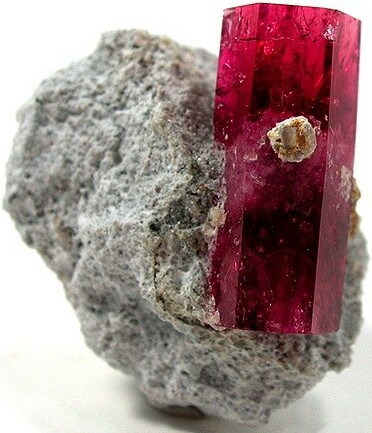
Red beryl

Red variety of beryl (the "bixbite") was first described in 1904 for an occurrence, its type locality, at Maynard's Claim (Pismire Knolls), Thomas Range, Juab County, Utah. The dark red color is attributed to Mn^{3+} ions. Old synonym "bixbite" is deprecated from the CIBJO because of the possibility of confusion with the mineral bixbyite (both named after mineralogist Maynard Bixby). Red "bixbite" beryl formerly was marketed as "red" or "scarlet emerald", but these terms involving "Emerald" terminology are now prohibited in the US.

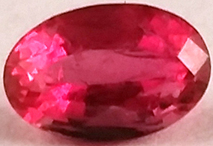
Faceted red beryl, 0.56 carats (0.112 g), Utah, US

Red beryl is very rare and has only been reported from a handful of North American locations: Wah Wah Mountains, Beaver County, Utah; Paramount Canyon, Round Mountain, Juab County, Utah; and Sierra County, New Mexico, although this locality does not often produce gem-grade stones. The bulk of gem-grade red beryl comes from the Ruby-Violet Claim in the Wah Wah Mts. of midwestern Utah, discovered in 1958 by Lamar Hodges, of Fillmore, Utah, while he was prospecting for uranium. Red beryl has been known to be confused with pezzottaite, a caesium analog of beryl, found in Madagascar and, more recently, Afghanistan; cut gems of the two varieties can be distinguished by their difference in refractive index, and the rough crystals easily by their differing crystal systems (pezzottaite trigonal, red beryl hexagonal). Synthetic red beryl is also produced. Like emerald and unlike most other varieties of beryl, the red ones are usually highly included.

While gem beryls are ordinarily found in pegmatites and certain metamorphic stones, red beryl occurs in topaz-bearing rhyolites. It is formed by crystallizing under low pressure and high temperature from a pneumatolytic phase along fractures or within near-surface miarolitic cavities of the rhyolite. Associated minerals include bixbyite, quartz, orthoclase, topaz, spessartine, pseudobrookite and hematite.

== See also ==
- Emerald
- Aquamarine
- Gemstone
- Gemology
- Chrysoberyl – Mineral or gemstone of beryllium aluminate
- List of minerals
- List of emeralds by size
