= Aqua =

Aqua is the Latin word for water. As such, it is often used in many words which relate to water, such as aquatic life. In English, it may also refer to:

== Arts ==
- Aqua (color), a greenish-blue color

== Business ==
- Aqua (Chicago), an 82-story residential skyscraper in Chicago, Illinois, US
- Aqua Multiespacio, a 22-story office building in Valencia, Spain
- Aqua Restaurant, an upscale seafood restaurant in San Francisco, California, US
- Aqua, an appliance brand owned by Haier
- Aqua, a brand of drinking water owned by Danone in Indonesia

== Entertainment ==
- Aqua (Deltarune), a fictional character from Deltarune
- Aqua (Kingdom Hearts), a fictional character from Square Enix's video game series
- Aqua (KonoSuba), a fictional character from the light novel series KonoSuba: God's Blessing on This Wonderful World!
- Aqua (manga), a Japanese manga by Amano Kozue
- Aqua (video game), 2010, for Xbox LIVE
- Team Aqua, a fictional villainous team from Pokémon Sapphire and its remake, as well as Pokémon Emerald
- Aqua Ranger, also known as James Navarro, the father of the Red Ranger Tyler Navarro from Power Rangers Dino (Super)Charge
- Aquamarine "Aqua" Hoshino, the male protagonist from the manga and anime series Oshi no Ko
- Aqua, the codename during development for the playable character Wuyang in Overwatch 2
- Minato Aqua, a Japanese virtual YouTuber

== Music ==
- Aqua (Angra album), 2010
- Aqua (Asia album), 1992
- Aqua (band), a Danish-Norwegian Eurodance group
- Aqua (Edgar Froese album), 1974
- Aqua (record producer) (born 1982), an American record producer and composer
- "Aqua", a song by Ryuichi Sakamoto on the 1999 album BTTB

== Other uses ==
- Aqua (ingredient), purified water used in cosmetics and pharmaceuticals
- Aqua (satellite), a multi-national NASA scientific research satellite
- Aqua (user interface), the visual theme of Apple's macOS operating system from 2000 Onward
- Aqua America, a water and wastewater utility company in several states, US
- Project Aqua, a proposed hydroelectric scheme for the Waitaki River, New Zealand
- Toyota Aqua, a car

== See also ==
- Agua (disambiguation)
- Aquafaba
- Aquagrill, a seafood restaurant in New York City
- Aquaman, a comic book superhero
- Aquamarine (disambiguation)
- Aquaculture
- Aqwa, the capital of Abkhazia
