= AQA (disambiguation) =

AQA may refer to or stand for:

aqa

- aqa, the ISO 639-5 for the unspecified Alacalufan languages

Aqa

- Aqa, one of two villages in Iran
  - Aqa, Kermanshah
  - Aqa, Lorestan

AQA

- AST-Quadram-Ashton-Tate, an alliance responsible for the definition of the Enhanced Expanded Memory Specification (EEMS)
- Assessment and Qualifications Alliance, an exam board in England, Wales and Northern Ireland
- The Aquatic Sector in the Metroid Fusion video game
- Australian Quadriplegic Association, renamed Spinal Cord Injuries Australia
- Analytical quality assurance
- IATA code for Araraquara Airport
- AQA (wrestler), professional wrestler
