= Nazim Erdem =

Australian wheelchair rugby player

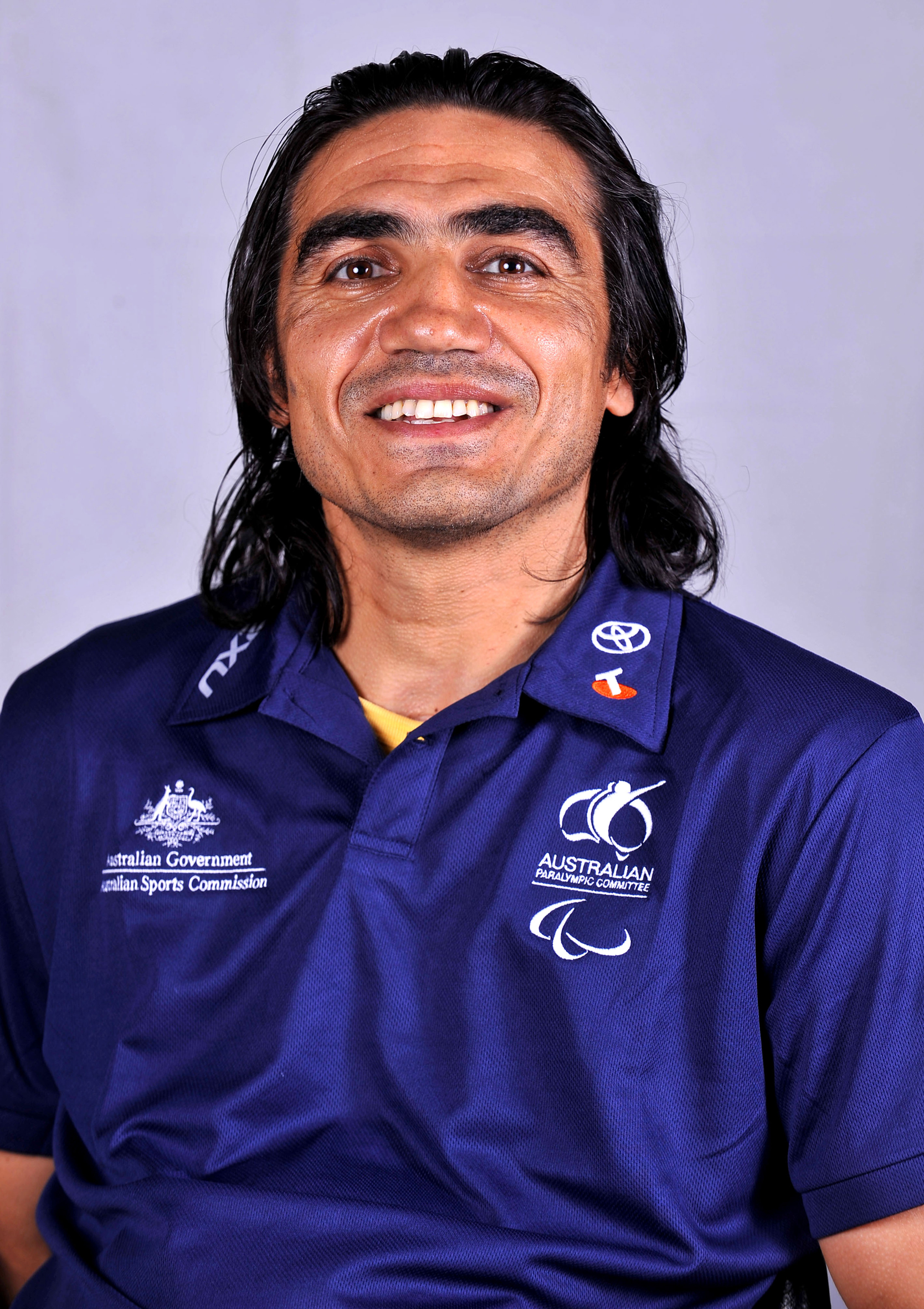
- 2012 Australian Paralympic team portrait of Erdem

Personal information
- Nationality: Australia
- Born: 1 August 1970 (age 56) Kayseri, Turkey

Sport
- Disability class: 0.5
Medal record
Wheelchair rugby
Paralympic Games
Silver medal – second place	2000 Sydney	Mixed
Silver medal – second place	2008 Beijing	Mixed
Gold medal – first place	2012 London	Mixed
Gold medal – first place	2016 Rio	Mixed
World Wheelchair Rugby Championships
Bronze medal – third place	2002 Gothenburg	Mixed
Silver medal – second place	2010 Vancouver	Mixed
Gold medal – first place	2014 Odense	Mixed

Nazim Erdem, OAM (born 1 August 1970) is an Australian wheelchair rugby Paralympic gold and silver medalist. He has won two gold and two silver medals at five Paralympics from 2000 to 2016.

== Personal ==
Nazim Erdem was born on 1 August 1970 in the Turkish city of Kayseri and later immigrated to Australia with his family. He became a quadriplegic at the age of 20 after diving off a pier into shallow water in an effort to impress some watching girls. As a youngster, he practiced holding his breath and could hold it for up to three minutes. His ability to hold his breath for a long period of time saved his life as he was under water for two-and-a-half minutes before he was rescued. He played Australian rules football and was an amateur boxer before the accident.

In 2002 he became the first person with a spinal cord injury to paraglide solo; he was also the first person with a spinal cord injury to compete in the Targa Tasmania car rally. He lives in the Melbourne suburb of Roxburgh Park, has a diploma in computer programming, and works as a peer support coordinator for the Australian Quadriplegic Association, a Victorian disability support organisation. Erdem is also a sports ambassador for the TAFISA World Sport for All Games.

== Wheelchair rugby ==
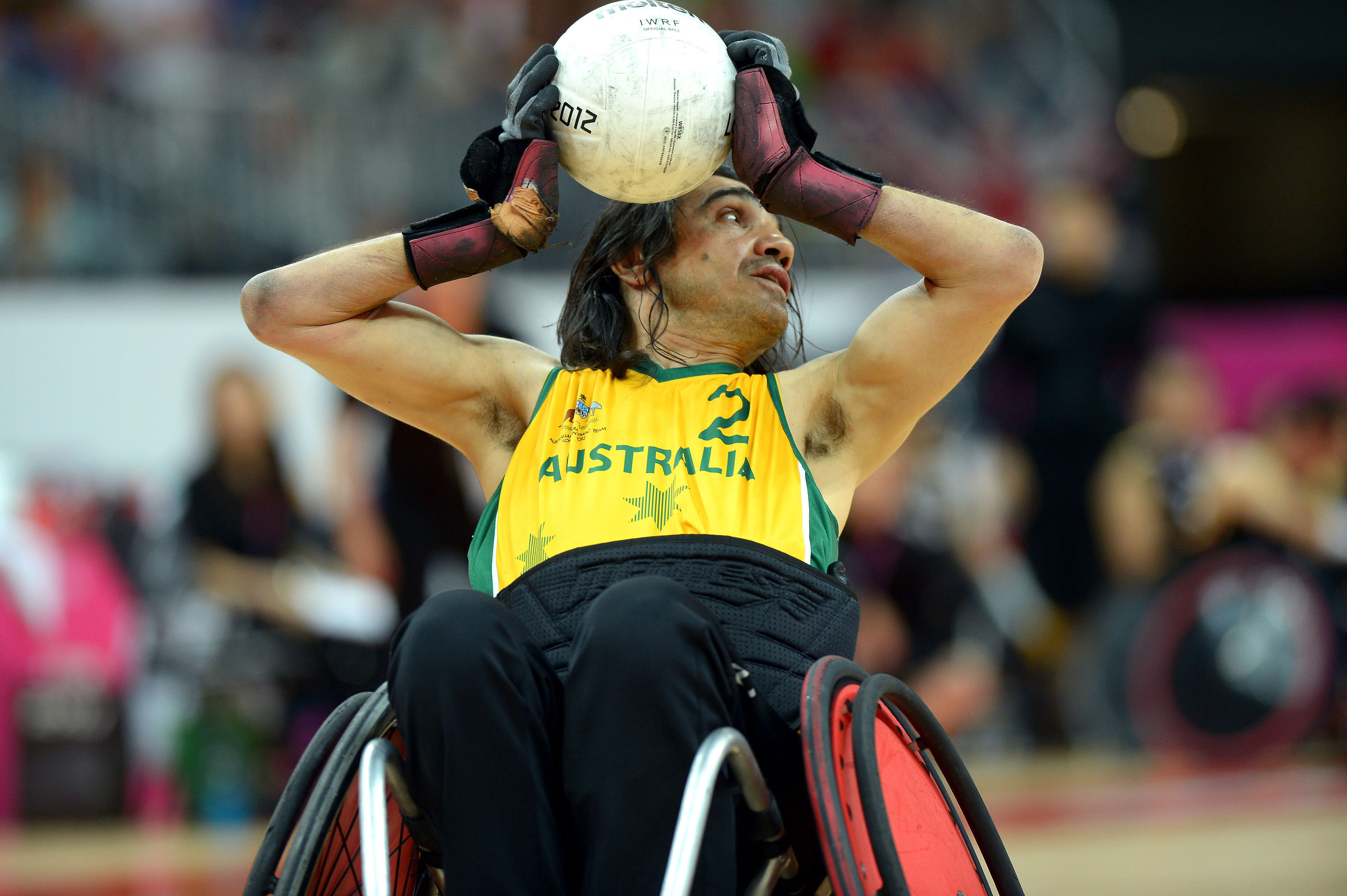
Erdem at the 2012 London Paralympics

Classified as a 0.5-point player, Erdem began playing wheelchair rugby in 1992. He first played for the Victorian wheelchair rugby team in 1994, and first played for the national team, the Australian Steelers, in the 1998 World Wheelchair Rugby Championships.

He was part of the national team at the 2000 Sydney, 2004 Athens, 2008 Beijing, 2012 London, and 2016 Rio de Janeiro Paralympics, winning a silver medal with them at the 2000 and 2008 games and gold medals in 2012 and 2016. At the World Wheelchair Rugby Championships, he was a member of Steelers teams that won bronze in 2002, silver in 2010 and gold in 2014.

Erdem announced his retirement in December 2017 after playing 312 games over two decades for the Steelers. He indicated that he would spend more time with his family and his growing role at the Australian Quadriplegic Association.

== Recognition ==
In June 2012, Erdem was named the Hume Leader's senior sports star of the week. He was awarded an Order of Australia Medal in the 2014 Australia Day Honours "for service to sport as a Gold Medallist at the London 2012 Paralympic Games." In October 2014, he and Lydia Lassila were joint winners of the Victorian Institute of Sport Gatorade Spirit Award. In 2016, Erdem was named the Hume Leader Senior Sports Star of the year. In 2018, he became the first Australian to be inducted into the International Wheelchair Rugby Federation (IWRF) Hall of Fame.
