= Bumpus Quarry =

- Interactive map of Bumpus Quarry

Location
- Location: Albany, Maine, United States; 44°18′43″N 70°46′52″W

Production
- Products: pegmatite, feldspar, beryl
- Type: Underground

History
- Opened: 1927
- Closed: 1966

Owner
- Company: Lawrence Stifler and Mary McFadden

Bumpus quarry is a quarry in Oxford County, Maine, in the United States. It is primarily known for being the source of some of the largest beryl crystals ever found, up to 27 feet (8.2 meters) in length, weighing 26 tonnes (23.6 metric tons).

== History ==
The quarry was opened in 1927 by Harry E. Bumpus, on land leased from the Cummings family. Bumpus worked the mine by hand from 1927 to 1933, mining feldspar, and Harold Perham began mining in 1934. In 1936 the title to the land was sold to the United Feldspar and Minerals Corporation. However, it was not clear who now owned the mineral rights for the mine, and a legal battle ensued between the Bumpus family and the corporation. The mine was officially closed from 1940 to 1945 due to the ongoing legal proceedings. During the closure, the mine flooded, and several surveys of the area were made by the United States Department of the Interior.

In 1945, the United Feldspar Corp and Bumpus came to an agreement, allowing Dan C. Douglas to start pumping the mine in April, reopening it later that year. In 1949, the United Feldspar Corp gained full control of the property, and Douglas formed the Northern Mining Corporation in order to officially lease the mineral rights for the mine. Around this time, many large beryl crystals were found, the largest of them being found in 1949. The mine changed hands several times over the next few years, closing down in 1966 after a worker was killed by falling rocks.

In 2005, the mine was bought by Dr. Lawrence Stifler and his wife Mary Mcfadden, with plans to reopen it as an educational facility about the history of mining in Oxford County. Tours around the mine are given for amateur geologists and school field trips.

== Minerals ==
Although the mine was opened to mine feldspar, and it is most famous for its large beryl deposits, it has produced several other minerals in notable quantities as well. These include:

- beryl (aquamarine and heliodor varieties)
- feldspar
- hematite
- pyrite
- quartz (rose and smokey varieties)
- rutile
- zircon.

== Bibliography ==
- Cameron, Eugene; Larrabee, David; MacNair, Andrew; Page, James; Stewart, Glenn; Shainin, Vincent (1954). Pegmatite Investigations 1942–45 New England (PDF) (Report). Geological Survey Professional Paper 255. United States Department of the Interior. doi:10.3133/pp255.
- Gregory, Gardiner (1968). "The Bumpus Mine, Albany, Maine". Rocks and Minerals. 43 (12): 904–907. doi:10.1080/00357529.1968.11765178.
- King, Vandall (2009). Maine Feldspar, Families and Feuds. Multicultural Book World. ISBN 978-0615291833.
- Neumann, G. L. (1952). Bumpus pegmatite deposit, Oxford County, Maine (Report). Report of Investigations 4862. U.S. Dept. of the Interior, Bureau of Mines.
