= Aqa, Iran =

Aqa (Persian: اقا) may refer to:

- Aqa, Kermanshah
- Aqa, Lorestan
