= List of tallest buildings in Valencia =

Valencia is third biggest city in Spain and 15th-most populous city in the European Union. City and its metropolitan area has two skyscrapers above 100 m (328 ft) and about 30 skyscrapers between 70 m (230 ft) and 100 m (328 ft), a total of thirty-some skyscrapers above 70 m (230 ft). Several skyscrapers were built between 2000 and 2012, several skyscrapers were built between 1990 and 2000, some skyscrapers were built earlier.

== Gallery ==
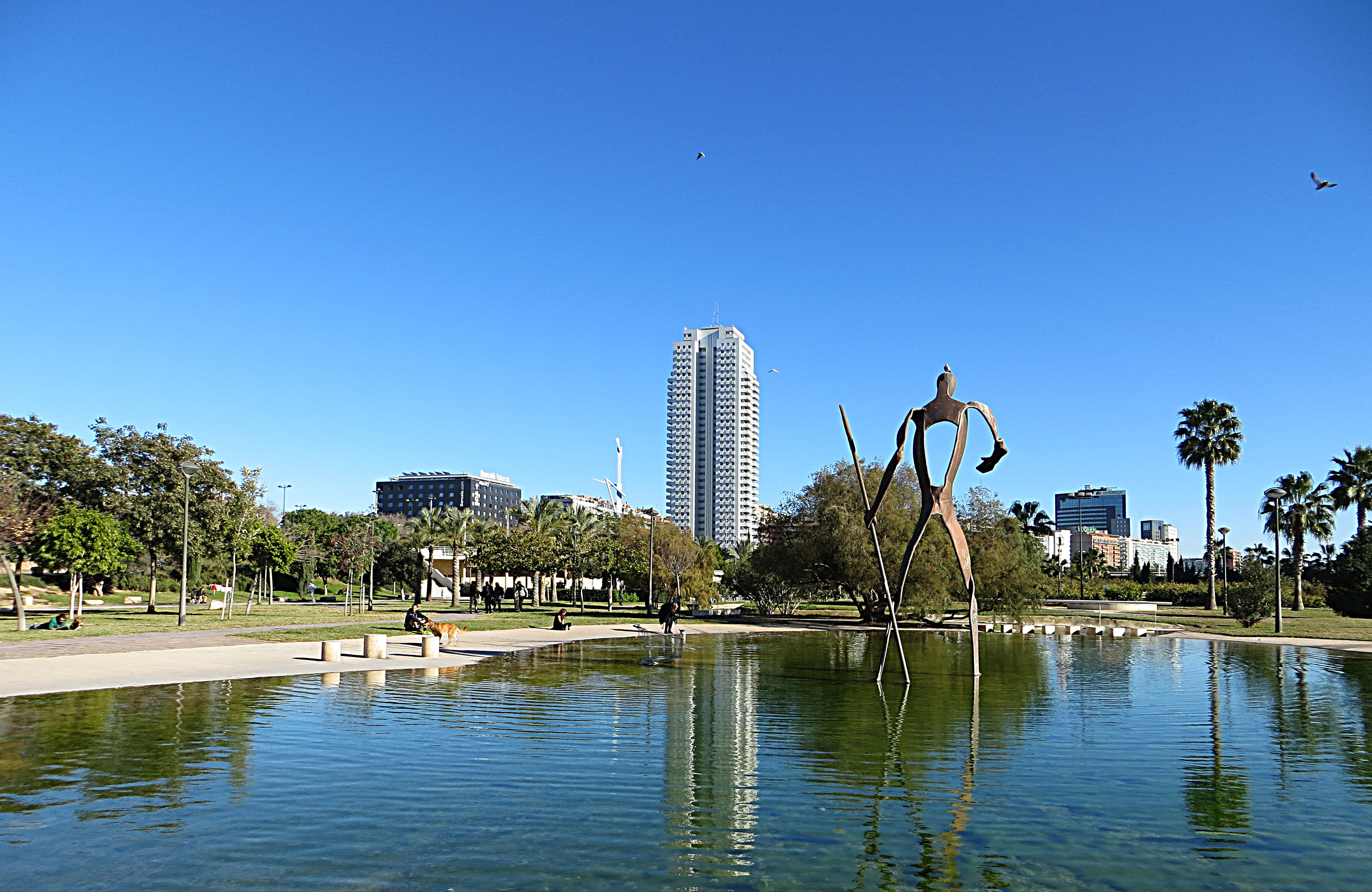
Skyscrapers in Valencia near Pg. de l'Albereda street and Ciudad de las Artes y las Ciencias

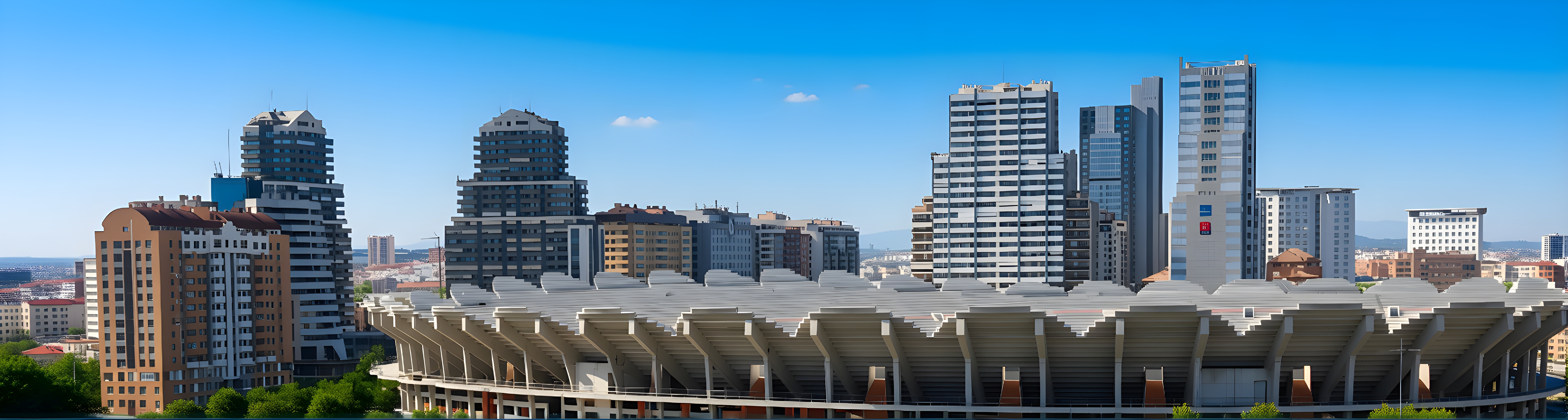
Skyscrapers in Valencia near Avenida de las Cortes Valencianas and Nou Mestalla

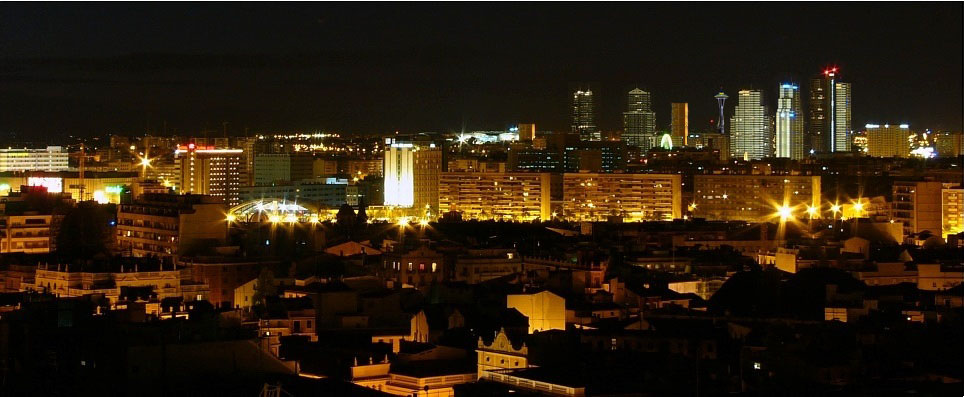
Skyscrapers in Valencia at night

== Tallest buildings ==
The list includes buildings around 70 m (230 ft) and above in the city of Valencia and its metropolitan area.

| Rank | Name | Image | Height m (ft) | Floors | Year | Use |
|---|---|---|---|---|---|---|
| 1 | Hilton Valencia (Torre Hilton) | | 117 m (384 ft) | 35 | 2006 | Hotel |
| 2 | Torre de Francia | | 115 m (377 ft) | 35 | 2002 | Residential |
| 3 | Torre Ikon | | 114 m (374 ft) | 29 | 2023 | Residential |
| 4 | Aqua Multiespacio 1 | | 95 m (312 ft) | 22 | 2006 | Office |
| 5= | Torre Llaves de Oro 1 | | 90 m (295 ft) | 26 | 2003 | Residential |
| 5= | Torre Llaves de Oro 2 | | 90 m (295 ft) | 26 | 2003 | Residential |
| 5= | Ademuz 1 | | 90 m (295 ft) | 26 | 2003 | Residential |
| 5= | Ademus 2 | | 90 m (295 ft) | 24 | 2003 | Hotel |
| 9 | Edificio Oceanis | | 85 m (279 ft) | 22 | 2010 | Residential |
| 10 | Edificio Garcerán | | 85 m (279 ft) | 22 | 1962 | Residential |
| 11 | Aries Center | | 83 m (272 ft) | 22 | under construction | Office |
| 12 | Torre Alameda I | | 82 m (269 ft) | 21 | 1999 | |
| 13 | Edificio Sol | | 81 m (266 ft) | 25 | 1967 | Residential |
| 14 | Edificio Navis | | 80 m (262 ft) | 22 | 2009 | Residential |
| 15= | Edificio Politaria A | | 78 m (256 ft) | 20 | 1999 | |
| 15= | Edificio Politaria B | | 78 m (256 ft) | 20 | 1999 | |
| 15= | Calle General Urrutia, 65 | | 78 m (256 ft) | 20 | 1997 | |
| 15= | Torre Ciudad de las Ciencias A | | 78 m (256 ft) | 20 | 1996 | |
| 15= | Edificio El Bachiller 31 | | 78 m (256 ft) | 20 | 1970 | Residential |
| 20 | Torre del Parc Central | | 74 m (243 ft) | 23 | under construction | Residential |
| 21= | SOB 1 | | 73 m (240 ft) | 21 | under construction | Public housing |
| 21= | Torres Oceanográficas | | 73 m (240 ft) | 21 | 2000 | Residential |
| 21= | Torre Alameda II | | 73 m (240 ft) | 21 | 1999 | Residential |
| 21= | Residencial Torres de Levante | | 73 m (240 ft) | 20 | 2009 | Office, residential |
| 25 | Edificio Arcade | | 72 m (236 ft) | 21 | 1994 | Office, residential |
| 26 | Torre del Sol | | 71 m (233 ft) | 20 | 1994 | Residential |
| 27= | Edificio Gulliver | | 70 m (230 ft) | 20 | 1999 | Residential |
| 27= | Torre Ciudad de las Ciencias B | | 70 m (230 ft) | 20 | 1996 | Residential |
| 27= | Torre Ciudad de las Ciencias C | | 70 m (230 ft) | 20 | 1998 | Residential |
| 27= | Torre Ciudad de las Ciencias D | | 70 m (230 ft) | 20 | 1998 | Residential |
| 27= | Edificio Bulevar | | 70 m (230 ft) | 18 | 2002 | Residential |
| 27= | Edificio Marola II | | 70 m (230 ft) | 18 | 2002 | Residential |
| 33= | La Torre | | ~70 m (230 ft) | 21 | under construction | Residential |
| 33= | Edificio R17 | | ~70 m (230 ft) | 21 | under construction | Residential |
| | Torre Parque Ademuz | | | 30 | under construction | Office |

== Tallest under construction - approved and proposed ==
| Name | Height m (ft) | Floors | Status | Use |
|---|---|---|---|---|
| Torre Valencia | 308 m (1,010 ft) | 81 | planned [proposed] | |
| Torre Castellón | 266 m (873 ft) | 71 | planned [proposed] | |
| Torre Alicante | 220 m (722 ft) | 58 | planned [proposed] | |
| Hotel 1 | 149 m (489 ft) | 42 | planned [approved] | Hotel |
| Hotel 2 | 149 m (489 ft) | 42 | planned [approved] | Hotel |
| Edificio Columbia 30 | 114 m (374 ft) | 30 | planned [approved] | Residential |
| Pont Mare 1 | 113 m (371 ft) | 25 | planned [proposed] | Office |
| Pont Mare 2 | 113 m (371 ft) | 25 | planned [proposed] | Office |
| Torre de la Música | 100 m (328 ft) | 26 | planned [approved] | School |
| Torre I | 97 m (318 ft) | 30 | planned [approved] | Residential |
| Torre II | 97 m (318 ft) | 30 | planned [approved] | Residential |
| Torre III | 97 m (318 ft) | 30 | planned [approved] | Residential |
| Parque Central 1 | 93 m (305 ft) | 26 | planned [proposed] | Office, residential |
| Parque Central 2 | 93 m (305 ft) | 26 | planned [proposed] | Office, residential |
| Parque Central 3 | 93 m (305 ft) | 26 | planned [proposed] | Office, residential |
| Parque Central 4 | 93 m (305 ft) | 26 | planned [proposed] | Office, residential |
| Nazaret 1 | 90 m (295 ft) | 26 | planned [proposed] | Residential |
| Nazaret 2 | 90 m (295 ft) | 26 | planned [proposed] | Residential |
| Sharing Tower | 90 m (295 ft) | 26 | planned [proposed] | Residential |
| Torres de Tulell - B7 | 81 m (266 ft) | 25 | planned [approved] | Residential |
| Torres de Tulell - B8 | 81 m (266 ft) | 25 | planned [approved] | Residential |
| Torres de Tulell - B9 | 81 m (266 ft) | 25 | planned [approved] | Residential |
| Torres de Tulell - B10 | 81 m (266 ft) | 25 | planned [approved] | Residential |
| Torres de Tulell - B11 | 81 m (266 ft) | 25 | planned [approved] | Residential |
| Torres de Tulell - B12 | 81 m (266 ft) | 25 | planned [approved] | Residential |
| Torres de Tulell - B13 | 81 m (266 ft) | 25 | planned [approved] | Residential |
| Torres de Tulell - B14 | 81 m (266 ft) | 25 | planned [approved] | Residential |
| Torres de Tulell - B15 | 81 m (266 ft) | 25 | planned [approved] | Residential |
| Jardines de Almazil I | 81 m (266 ft) | 25 | planned [approved] | Residential |
| Jardines de Almazil II | 81 m (266 ft) | 25 | planned [approved] | Residential |
| Catarroja Nou Mileni 1 | 81 m (266 ft) | 25 | planned [proposed] | Residential |
| Catarroja Nou Mileni 2 | 81 m (266 ft) | 25 | planned [proposed] | Residential |
| Catarroja Nou Mileni 3 | 81 m (266 ft) | 25 | planned [proposed] | Residential |
| Catarroja Nou Mileni 4 | 81 m (266 ft) | 25 | planned [proposed] | Residential |
| Torre 1 to 33 (33 buildings) | 81 m (266 ft) | 25 | planned [proposed] | Residential |
| Apartamentos para Mayores | 76 m (249 ft) | 22 | planned [proposed] | Residential |
| Torre de viviendas | 73 m (240 ft) | 21 | planned [approved] | Residential |
| Huerta Tower | 73 m (240 ft) | 21 | planned [approved] | Public housing |
| R-10 Tower | 73 m (240 ft) | 21 | planned [approved] | Public housing |
| Torre Radial | 73 m (240 ft) | 21 | planned [approved] | Public housing |
| Torre Solar | 73 m (240 ft) | 21 | planned [approved] | Public housing |
| Torre 101373 | 73 m (240 ft) | 21 | planned [approved] | Public housing |
| Edificio Dédalo | 70 m (230 ft) | 20 | planned [approved] | Residential |
| PAI Moreras 2 | 70 m (230 ft) | 20 | planned [approved] | Residential |
| PAI Benimaclet | 70 m (230 ft) | 20 | planned [approved] | Residential |
| Sociopolis Habitat Mediterráneo | no data | 25 | planned [proposed] | no data |
| Quint II Edificio 1 | no data | 22 | planned [proposed] | Residential |
| Quint II Edificio 2 | no data | 22 | planned [proposed] | Residential |
| Quint II Edificio 3 | no data | 22 | planned [proposed] | Residential |
| Quint II Edificio 4 | no data | 22 | planned [proposed] | Residential |
| Quint II Edificio 5 | no data | 22 | planned [proposed] | Residential |
| Quint II Edificio 6 | no data | 22 | planned [proposed] | Residential |
| Edificio Edival La Torre | no data | 21 | planned [site preparation] | Residential |
| Torre Valencia | no data | 21 | planned [site preparation] | Residential |
