= Dom Pedro aquamarine =

World's largest cut aquamarine gem

Dom Pedro Aquamarine
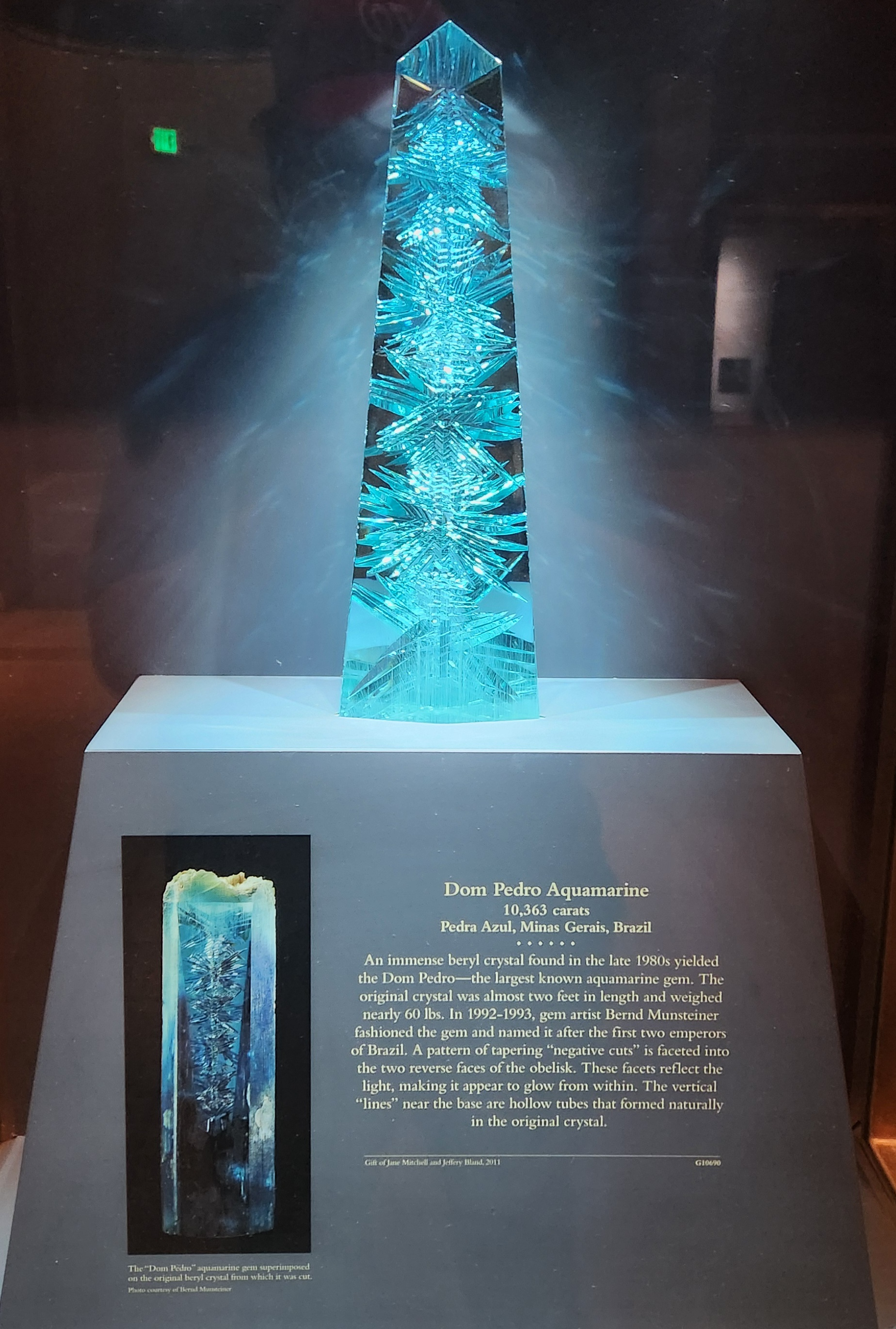
- The Dom Pedro aquamarine at the Natural History Museum in Washington, D.C.

General
- Category: Oxide mineral
- Formula: Be_{3}Al_{2}Si_{6}O_{18}

The Dom Pedro aquamarine is the world's largest cut aquamarine gem. It was cut from a crystal originally weighing approximately 60 pounds (27 kg) and measuring almost 2 feet (0.61 m) in length. The stone was mined in Pedra Azul, in the state of Minas Gerais in Brazil around 1980, and named after the Brazilian emperors Pedro I and Pedro II. The blue-green gemstone was cut by Bernd Munsteiner into an obelisk form weighing 10,363 carats. The finished dimensions measure 14 inches (36 cm) tall by 4 inches (10 cm) wide. The jewel was donated to the Smithsonian Institution by Jane Mitchell and Jeffery Bland. It is housed in the National Museum of Natural History's Janet Annenberg Hooker Hall of Geology.

== See also ==
- List of individual gemstones
- Aquamarine (gem)
