= Aquamarine =

Aquamarine may refer to:

- Aquamarine (color), a shade between green and blue
- Aquamarine (gemstone), a type of pale-blue to light-green beryl

Aquamarine may also refer to:

== Arts, entertainment and media ==
=== Music ===
- Aquamarine (album), by Ash Walker, 2019
- "Aquamarine" (song), by Addison Rae, 2024
- "Aquamarine", a song by Drugstore from Anatomy, 2011
- "Aqua Marine", a song by Santana from Marathon, 1979

=== Other uses in media ===
- Aquamarine (novel), by Alice Hoffman, 2001
  - Aquamarine (film), by Elizabeth Allen, 2006
- Aquamarine (video game), by Moebial Studios, 2022
- Aquamarine, a character on the Cartoon Network show Steven Universe
- Aquamarine "Aqua" Hoshino, the male protagonist in manga and anime series Oshi no Ko

== Other uses ==
- Aquamarine (window decorator), a software application
- USS Aquamarine (PYc-7), a patrol vessel of the United States Navy, named for the stone
- Aqua Marine, a private housing estate in Cheung Sha Wan, Hong Kong
- One of the former names of the motor vessel Ocean Star Pacific

== See also ==
- Aquamarine Power, a wave energy company that developed the Oyster wave energy converter
- Aquamarine Fukushima, an aquarium in Fukushima
- Aquamarina, a fungal genus
- Aquimarina, a bacterial genus
