= Acquity Group =

- Type: Public company
- Industry: Digital Marketing
- Founded: 2001
- Defunct: 2013 (acquisition completed)
- Fate: Acquired
- Headquarters: Chicago, Illinois, USA
- Key people: Jay Dettling (president) Founders; Chris Dalton; Paul Weinewuth; Matt Schmeltz Scott Spear
- Revenue: $141+ million (2012)
- Owner: Accenture
- Number of employees: 600
- Website: www.acquitygroup.com

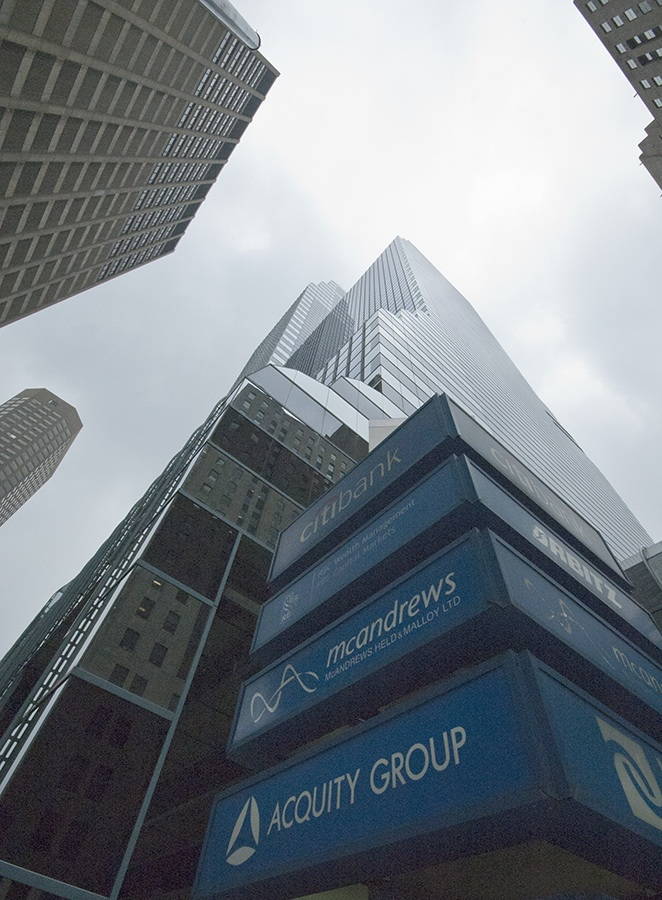
Acquity Group Headquarters in Ogilvie Station, Chicago

Acquity Group, LLC was an eCommerce and digital marketing company with U.S. headquarters in Chicago and offices across North America. It was acquired by Accenture in 2013.

Acquity Group has domestic offices in New York City, Dallas, Seattle, San Francisco, Irvine, Scottsdale, Overland Park, Boise and Atlanta. Its international offices are located in Toronto and Ottawa in Canada. Acquity Group's work with more than 600 global brands covers eCommerce, mobile, and social media.

== History ==
Acquity Group was founded in 2001 by Chris Dalton, Paul Weinewuth, Scott Spear and Matt Schmeltz, who contracted with technology marketing agency BIGfrontier, in Chicago, to launch and grow the company Dalton, who was named the Ernst & Young Entrepreneur of the Year in 2009, is chief executive officer. Acquity Group filed for an IPO in 2012 and was listed on. the New York Stock Exchange. In May 2013, Acquity Group was acquired by Accenture for $316 million. Acquity Group is now a part of Accenture Interactive.

Acquity helps its clients use the Internet to increase sales and improve user-experience through an approach it pioneered, known as Brand eCommerce, which incorporates user-experience, creative design, back-end technical implementation and architecture.

Acquity's clients represent a broad base of B2B and B2C companies in a variety of industries. Past and present clients include Adobe, American Airlines, AT&T, Garmin, General Motors, McDonald's, Motorola, and Saks Fifth Avenue.

== Mobile Audit ==
Acquity's Mobile Commerce Audit, an analysis of the Internet Retailer 500 that identifies commerce companies with an active mobile presence, is published annually. The results of the 2009 Mobile Commerce Audit showed that only 4% of the United States' top 500 online retailers had websites compatible with mobile browsers. The 2010 Mobile Audit revealed that 12% of the top web merchants had m-commerce sites; in 2011, that number increased to 37%.

In 2011, Acquity issued its first European Mobile Audit, which revealed that nearly a quarter of Europe's top online retailers had some sort of mobile app and just under 20 percent had a website optimized for mobile devices.

== Brand eCommerce Audit ==
Acquity's Brand eCommerce Audit is compiled annually and ranks commerce companies across six channels: big browser, mobile/tablet, social, in-store, search and email. Its inaugural report, released November 2012, analyzed Interbrand's "Best Retail Brands of 2012" and examined customer expectations across six channels.

In 2012, Acquity Brand eCommerce Audit's research revealed that 82 percent of retailers have a mobile optimized site, 72 percent have a mobile or tablet app, and 66 percent have both.
