= Aqua Multiespacio =

Skyscraper in Valencia, Spain

Coordinates: 39.45653°N 0.34619°W

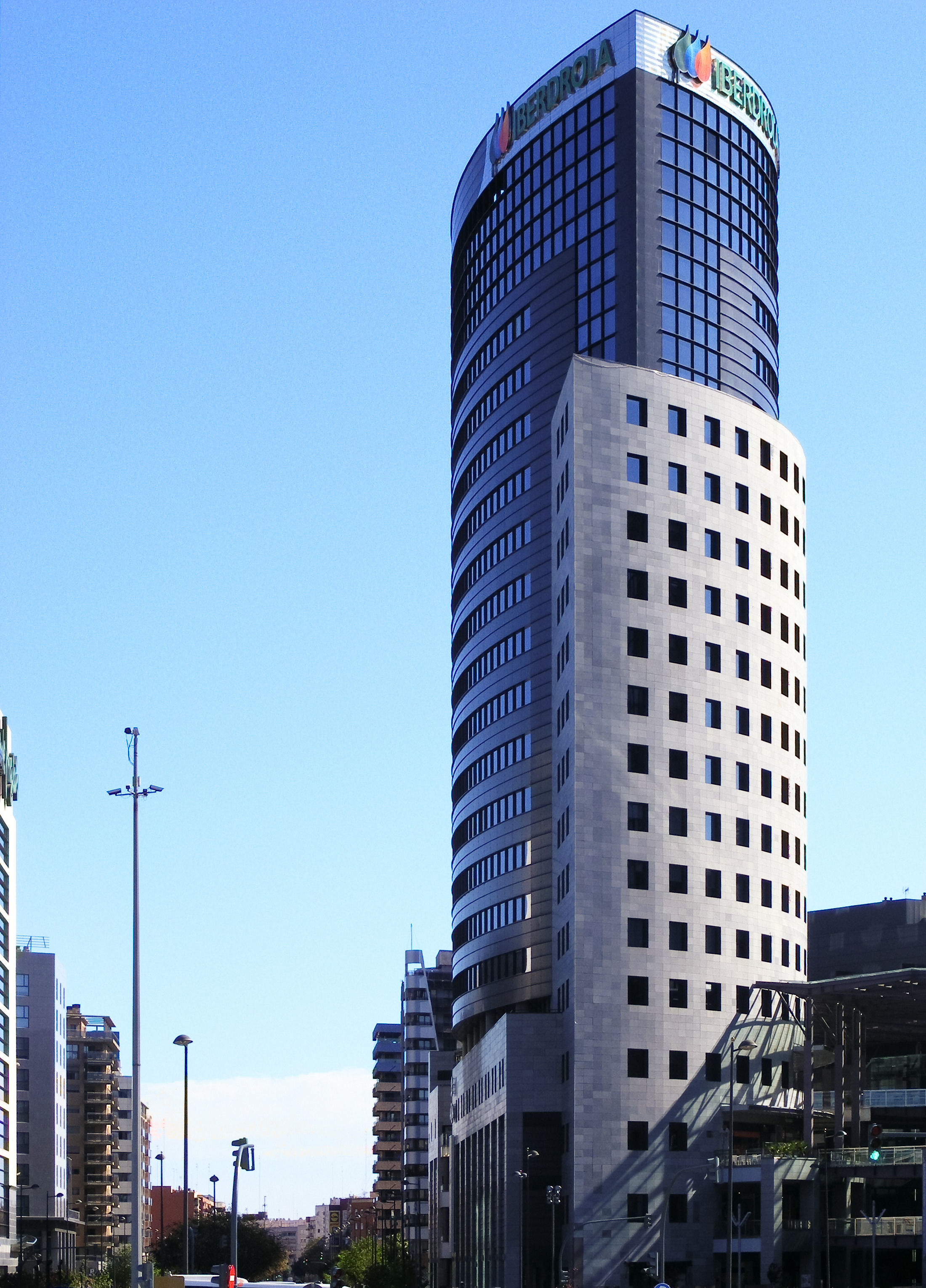
- Interactive map of the Aqua Multiespacio area

General information
- Status: Completed
- Type: office, hotel
- Location: Valencia, Spain
- Construction started: 2002
- Completed: 2006

Height
- Height: 95 m (312 ft)

Technical details
- Floor count: 22

Aqua Multiespacio is an office skyscraper in Valencia, Spain. Completed in 2006, it has 22 floors and stands 95 metres (312 feet) tall. This makes it the third tallest building in Valencia, after the Hilton Valencia and Torre de Francia.

The complex consists of two towers. Construction began in 2002 and ended in 2006. The complex was designed by two architectural firms: E. Clerk Architects and L35 with Eduardo Simarro. It is located near the City of Arts and Sciences. The five-story parking garage has a capacity of 2,400 vehicles. The construction of the parking garage took more than a year. The initial plan for the project case was designed by Jerde California. However, it was Spanish architectural firms, Simarro and Escribano, which gave shape and form to the construction.

The building was opened in mid May 2006 and has 110 stores in an area of 36,000 square meters. The office tower is 23,000 square meters, and there is also 16,000 square meters for two hotels. The construction cost was €240 million.

The shareholders for the project are Iberdrola estate, whose headquarters have been moved to the complex and Valencia Gesfesa residential.

== See also ==
- List of tallest buildings in Valencia
