= Agua =

Agua means water in Spanish.

Agua may also refer to:

== Places ==
- Agua de Dios (God's water), a municipality in Colombia
- Volcán de Agua, a stratovolcano located in Guatemala

== Arts, entertainment, and media ==
- Agua (film), a 2006 Argentine and French sports drama film
- "Agua" (Tainy and J Balvin song), 2020
- "Agua" (Daddy Yankee song), 2022
- "Agua" (Maluma and Shakira song), 2026
- "Agua", a 2007 song by Café Tacuva from Sino
- "Agua", a 2002 song by Miranda! from Es Mentira
- "Agua", a 2018 song by Saweetie from High Maintenance
- "Agua", a 2024 song by Ca7riel & Paco Amoroso
- "Água de Beber", a song by Antônio Carlos Jobim and Vinicius de Moraes

== See also ==
- Águas
