= Adversity quotient =

Psychological scale measuring ability to handle adversity

An adversity quotient (AQ) is a score that measures the ability of a person to deal with adversities in their life. As per W Hidayat, the AQ also has an effect on the student's mathematics understandability. The term was coined by Paul Stoltz in 1997 in his book Adversity Quotient: Turning Obstacles Into Opportunities. To quantify the adversity quotient, Stoltz developed an assessment method called the Adversity Response Profile (ARP).

The AQ is one of the probable indicators of a person's success in life and is also primarily useful to predict attitude, mental stress, perseverance, longevity, learning, and response to changes in environment.

== Bibliography ==
- Stoltz, P. (1997). Adversity quotient: Turning obstacles into opportunities. New York: Wiley, ISBN 978-0471344131
- Adversity Quotient @ Work: Make Everyday Challenges the Key to Your Success--Putting the Principles of AQ Into Action by Paul G. Stoltz, Ph.D. (Morrow, 2000), ISBN 978-0688177591
- Adversity Quotient at Work: Finding Your Hidden Capacity for Getting Things Done by Paul G. Stoltz, Ph.D. (Collins, 2001), ASIN: B000W25NPI
