= Double terminated crystal =

Crystal with natural faces on both ends

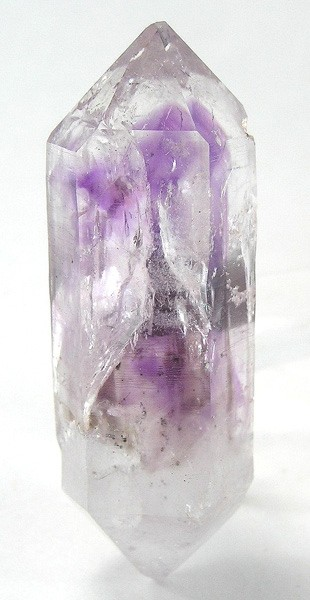
Doubly terminated amethystine quartz crystal

A doubly terminated crystal, or double-terminated crystal, is a crystal with natural facets on both ends.
