= Torre de Francia =

Skyscraper in Valencia

Coordinates: 39°27′35″N 0°21′09″W

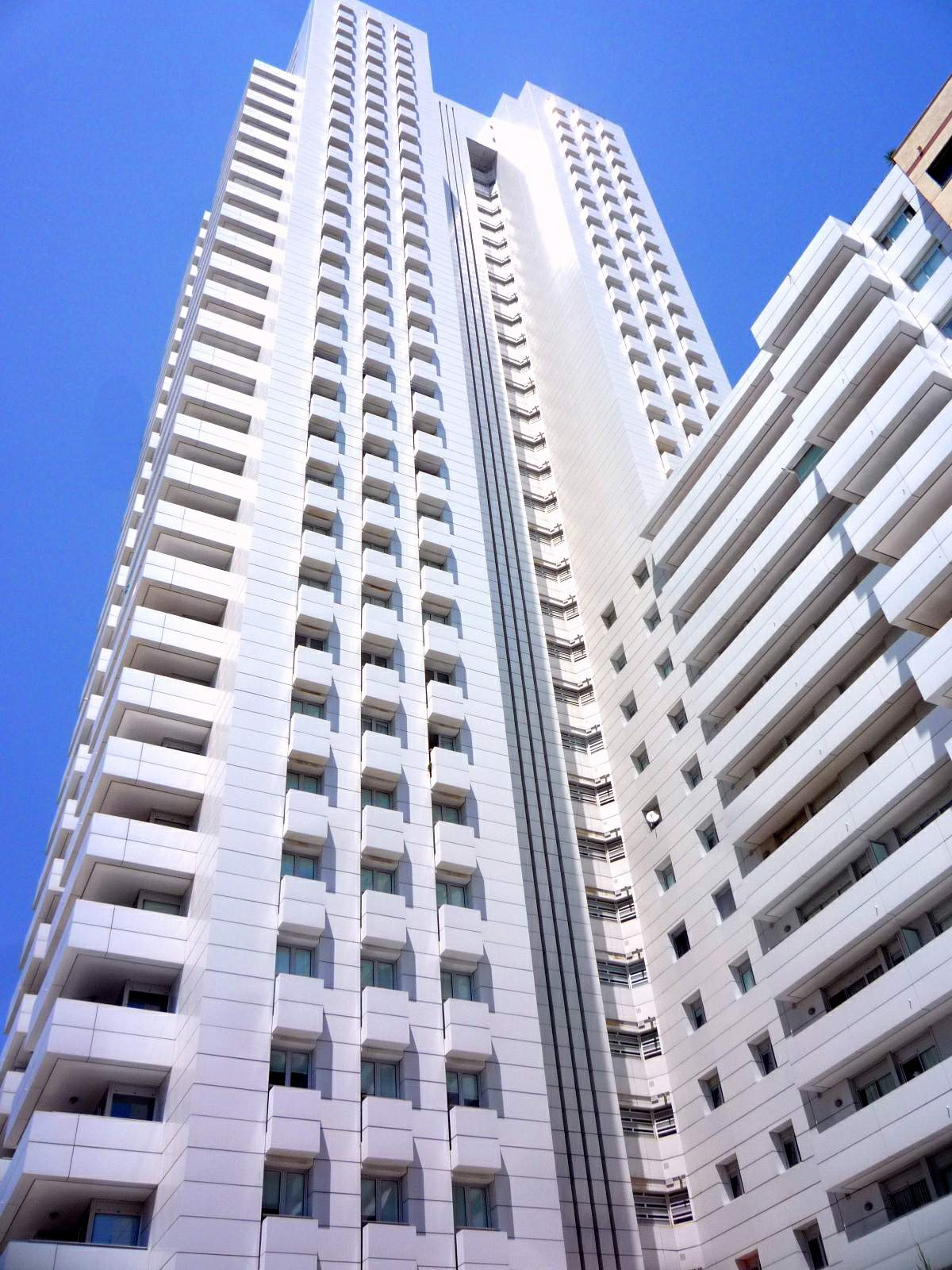
- Interactive map of the Torre de Francia area

General information
- Status: Completed
- Type: residential
- Location: Valencia, Spain
- Completed: 2002

Height
- Height: 115 m (377 ft)

Technical details
- Floor count: 35

Torre de Francia is a residential skyscraper in Valencia, Spain. Completed in 2002, has 35 floors and rises 115 metres. This is the second tallest building in Valencia, after Hilton Valencia.

== See also ==
- List of tallest buildings in Valencia
