= Deh-e Aqa, Lorestan =

Deh-e Aqa ده اقا
- Village
- Location within Iran
- Coordinates: 33°52′21″N 48°10′46″E
- Country: Iran
- Province: Lorestan
- County: Selseleh
- Bakhsh: Firuzabad
- Rural District: Firuzabad

Population (2006)
  - Total: 397
- Time zone: UTC+3:30 (IRST)
  - Summer (DST): UTC+4:30 (IRDT)

Deh-e Aqa (Persian: ده اقا, also Romanized as Deh-e Āqā; also known as Āgha and Āqā) is a village in Firuzabad Rural District, Firuzabad District, Selseleh County, Lorestan Province, Iran. At the 2006 census, its population was 397, in 81 families.
