= Aquamarine (gem) =

Variety of beryl

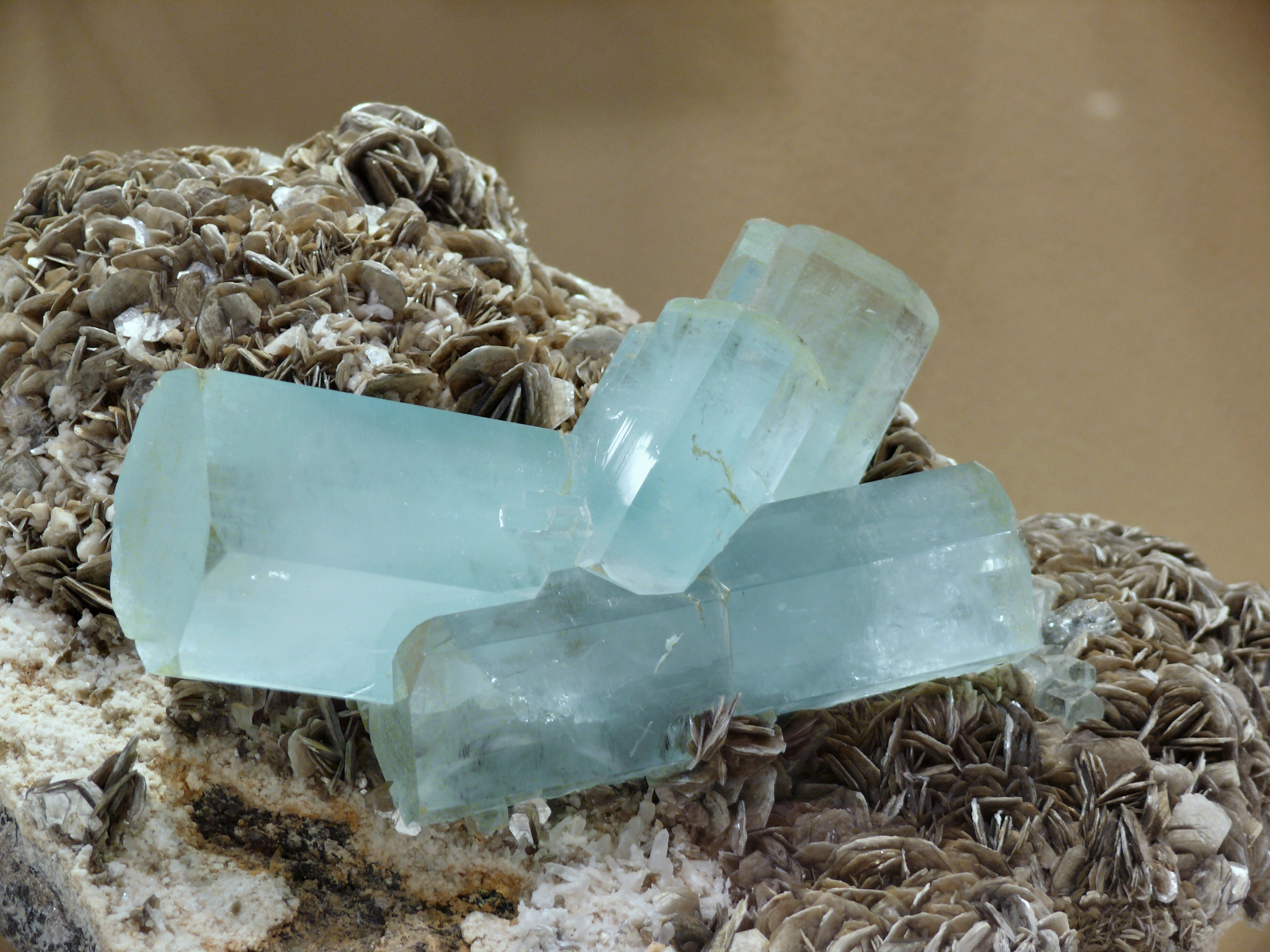
- Aquamarine on muscovite

General
- Category: Silicate minerals, beryl variety
- Formula: Be_{3}Al_{2}Si_{6}O_{18}
- Crystal class: 6/mmm
- Space group: P6/mcc
- Unit cell: a = 9.2099 Å; b = 9.2099 Å; c = 9.1894 Å

Identification
- Color: Pale blue to light green
- Fracture: Conchoidal
- Mohs scale hardness: 7.5–8
- Luster: vitreous/glassy
- Streak: White
- Diaphaneity: Transparent to translucent
- Specific gravity: 2.65–2.85
- Refractive index: 1.57-1.59

Aquamarine is a pale-blue to light-green variety of gemstone, part of the beryl family. It is transparent to translucent and possesses a hexagonal crystal system. Aquamarine is a fairly common gemstone, rendering it more accessible for purchase, compared to other gems in the beryl family.

Aquamarine mainly forms in granite pegmatites and hydrothermal veins, a process that takes millions of years and is associated with Precambrian rocks.

Aquamarine occurs in many countries over the world, and is most commonly used for jewelry, decoration and its properties.

Famous aquamarines include the Dom Pedro, the Roosevelt Aquamarine, the Hirsch Aquamarine, Queen Elizabeth's Tiara, Meghan Markle's ring, and the Schlumberger bow.

== Name and etymology ==
The name aquamarine comes from aqua (Latin for 'water'), and marine, deriving from marina (Latin for 'of the sea'). The word aquamarine was first used in the year 1677.

The word aquamarine has been used as a modifier for other minerals like aquamarine tourmaline, aquamarine emerald, aquamarine chrysolite, aquamarine sapphire, or aquamarine topaz.

== Physical properties ==
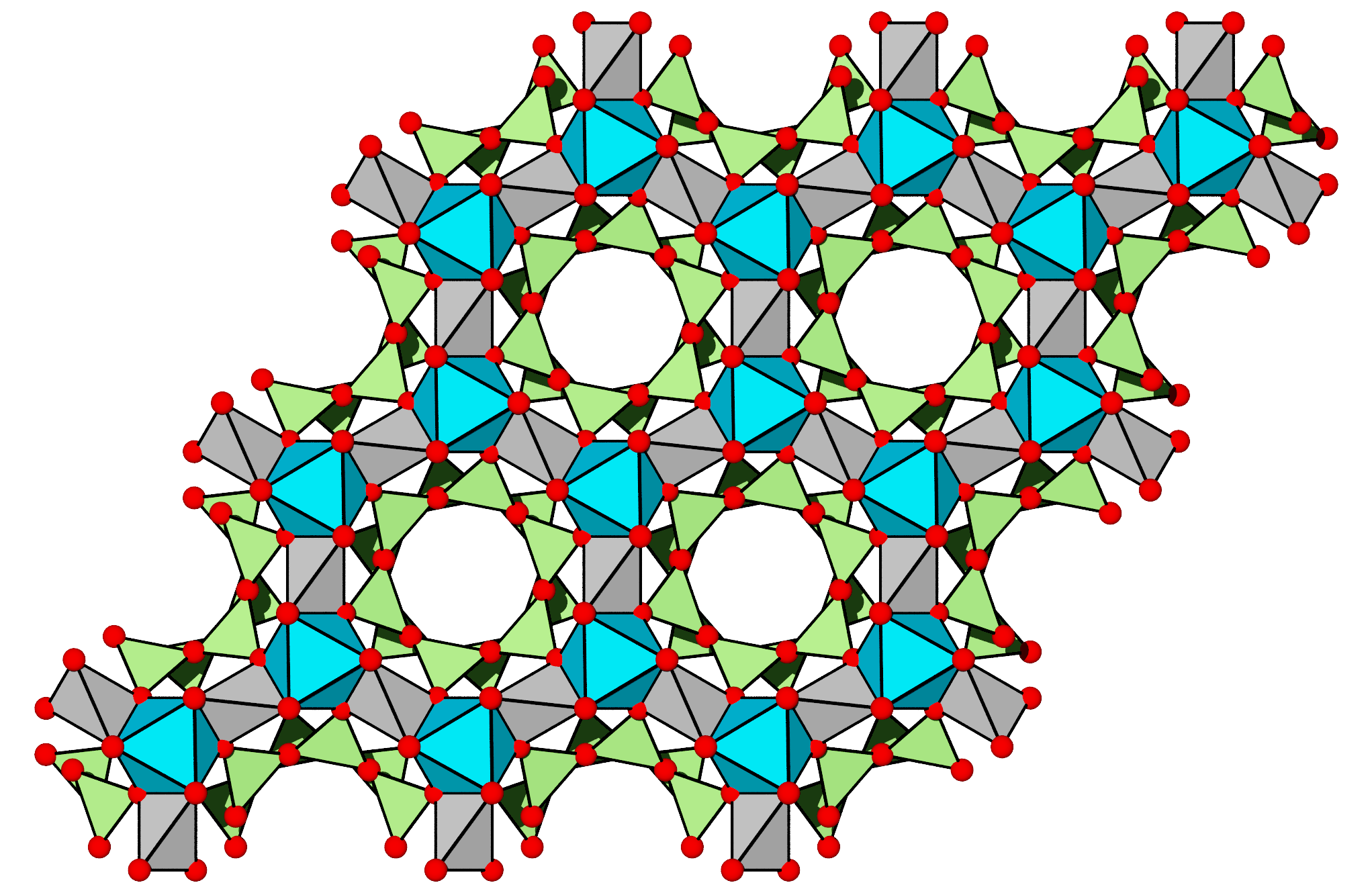
Crystal structure of Aquamarine

Aquamarine is blue with hues of green, caused by trace amounts of iron found within the crystal structure. It can vary from pale to vibrant and transparent to translucent. Better transparency in aquamarine gemstones means that light may go through the crystal with less interference. The hexagonal crystal system is where aquamarine crystallizes. It forms prismatic crystals with a hexagonal cross-section. These crystals can be microscopic to enormous in size and frequently feature faces with vertical striating. The lustre of aquamarine ranges from vitreous to resinous. It can have a glass-like brilliance and a sheen when cut and polished correctly.

== Chemical composition ==
Aquamarine has a chemical composition of Be_{3}Al_{2}Si_{6}O_{18}, also containing Fe^{2+}. It belongs to the beryl family, which it shares with emerald, morganite, and heliodor. Aquamarine is chemically stable and resistant to acids. It has a hardness of 7.5–8 on the Mohs scale. While aquamarine often contains no inclusions, it may possess them, with content such as mica, hematite, saltwater, biotite, rutile or pyrite. Its hardness on the Mohs scale of mineral hardness is rated as 7.5-8. This rating gives aquamarine the chance to be a very suitable gem for everyday wear.

== Geological formation ==
Beryllium is a necessary component for the formation of aquamarine, a type of beryl. Although beryllium is a relatively uncommon element in the Earth's crust, it can be found in concentrated forms in some geological settings. These include beryllium-rich hydrothermal systems and granite pegmatites, which contain large amounts of beryllium-bearing minerals.

Pegmatites are coarse grained igneous rocks, and the last component of a granitic magma to crystallize. This residual magma is rich in volatile elements and minerals such as silicon, aluminum, and beryllium, providing an environment favorable to aquamarine formation.

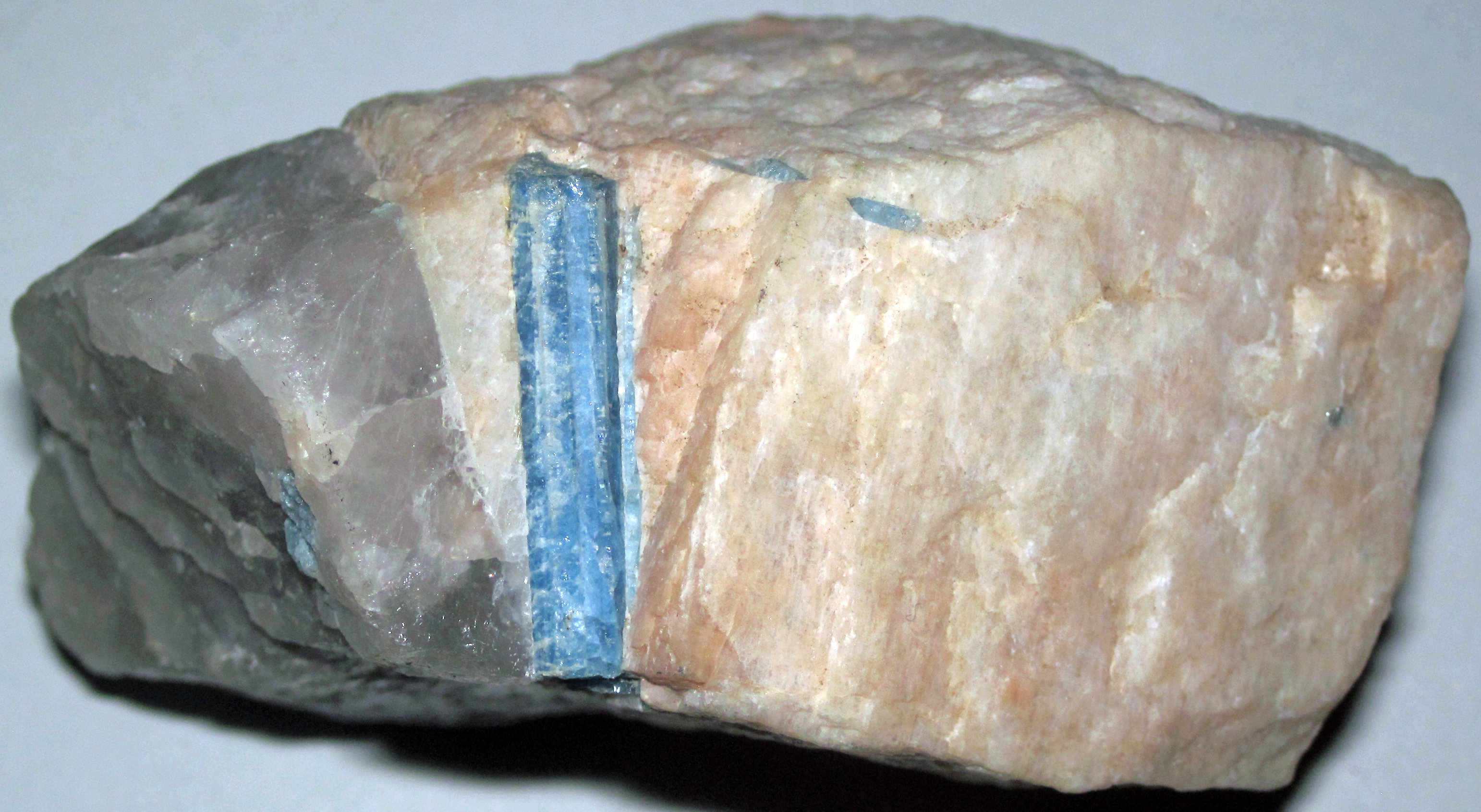
Aquamarine found in granite pegmatite

Aquamarine may also be formed by hydrothermal fluids, which are hot, mineral-rich solutions. These fluids may precipitate into minerals, including aquamarine.

== Value ==
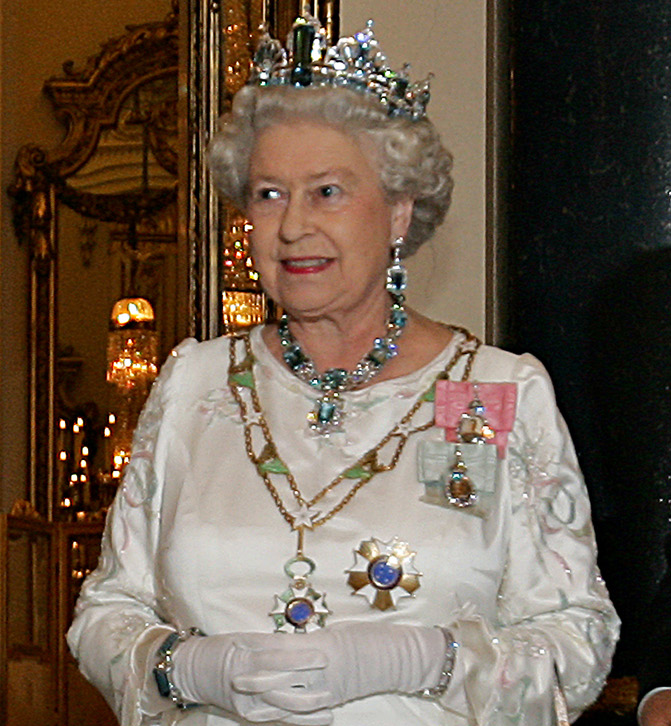
Queen Elizabeth II wearing an aquamarine jewel set, a coronation gift from Brazil (except for the tiara).

The value of aquamarine is determined by its weight, color, cut, and clarity. Due to its relative abundance, aquamarine is comparatively less expensive than other gemstones within the beryl group, such as emerald or bixbite (red beryl), however it is typically more expensive than similarly colored gemstones such as blue topaz. Maxixe is a rarer variant of aquamarine with a deep blue coloration, however its color can fade due to sunlight. The color of maxixe is caused by NO_{3}. Dark-blue maxixe color can be produced in green, pink or yellow beryl by irradiating it with high-energy radiation (gamma rays, neutrons or even X-rays). Heat treatment of aquamarine is sometimes performed to alter color; naturally occurring blue hued aquamarine specimens are more expensive than those that have undergone heat treatment to reduce yellow tones caused by ferric iron. Cut aquamarines that are over 25 carats will have a lower price per carat than smaller ones of the same quality. Overall, the quality and color will vary depending on the source of the gem.

== In culture ==
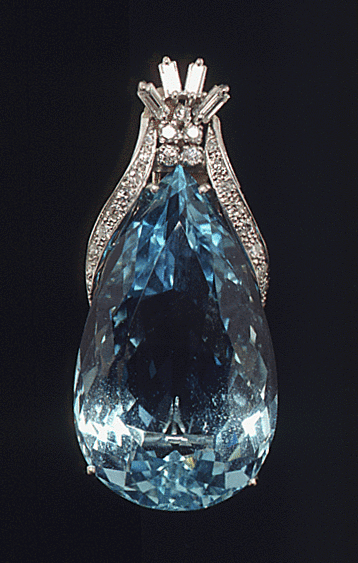
Aquamarine stone in a platinum and diamond pendant. The item belonged to Lady Bird Johnson (U.S. first lady from 1963 to 1969) and was a gift to her from Brazilian president Artur da Costa e Silva.

Aquamarine is the birth stone for the month of March. It has historically been used a symbol for youth and happiness due to its color, which has also, along with its name, made Western culture connect it with the ocean. Ancient tales have claimed that aquamarine came from the treasure chests of mermaids, which led to sailors using this gemstone as a lucky charm to protect against shipwreck. Additionally, ancient Romans believed this stone had healing properties, due to the stone being almost invisible when submerged in water.

The Ancient Greeks engraved aquamarine and turned them into intaglios. The Chinese used it to make seals, and showpiece dolls. The Japanese used it to make netsuke.

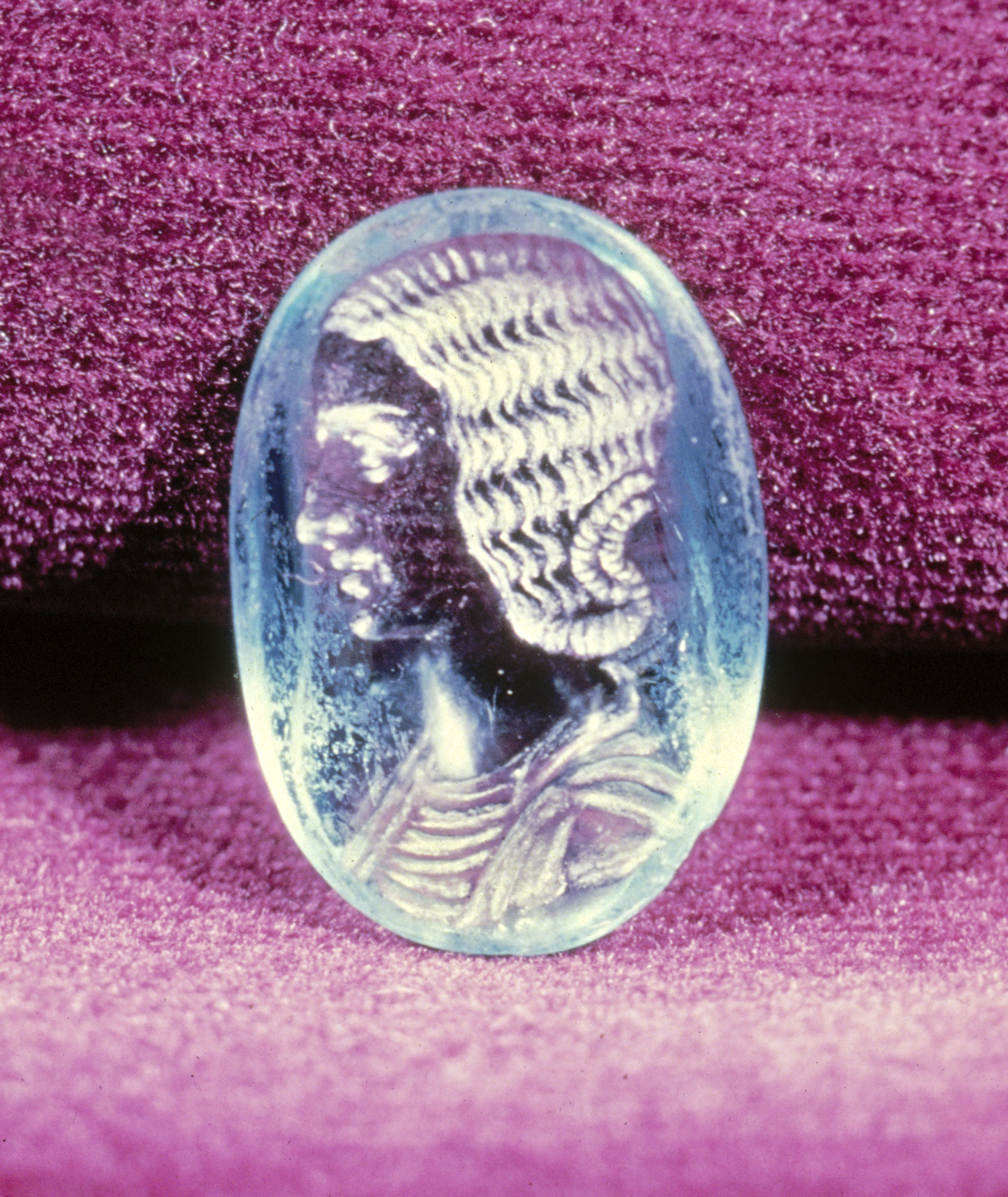
Portrait of Julia Domma carved into aquamarine in 1942. (Intaglio)

Aquamarine is mainly used for jewelry, decoration and its properties. It can be cut and shaped into rings, earrings, necklaces, and bracelets.

Aquamarine became a state gem for Colorado in 1971.

== Occurrence ==
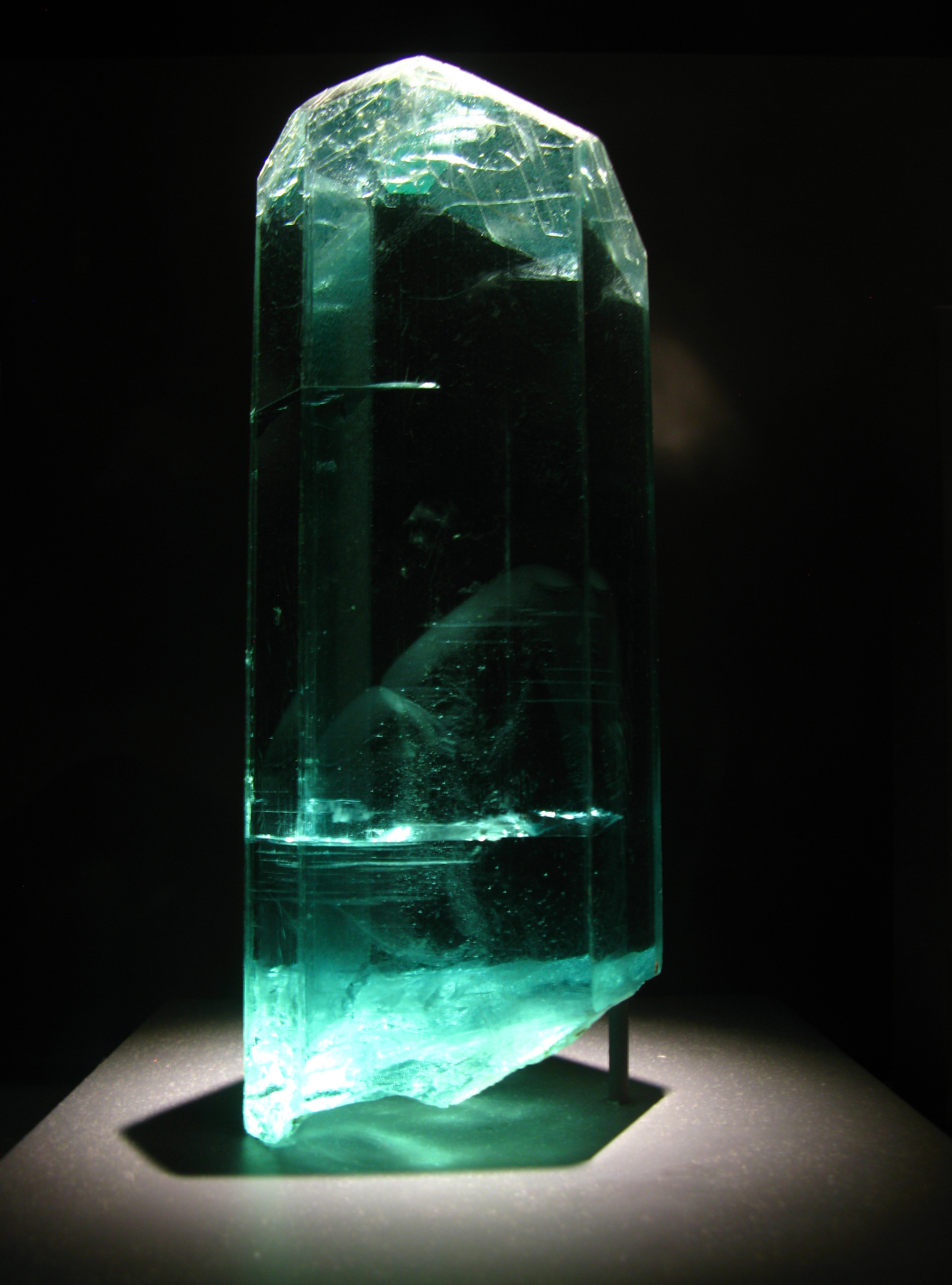
Aquamarine of 15,256 carats from Minas Gerais, Brazil

Aquamarine can be found in Afghanistan, China, Kenya, Pakistan, Russia, Mozambique, the United States, Brazil, Nigeria, Madagascar, Zambia, Tanzania, Sri Lanka, Malawi, India, Zimbabwe, Australia, Myanmar, and Namibia. The Brazilian state of Minas Gerais is a major source for aquamarine.

Aquamarine can mostly be found in granite pegmatites. It can also be found in veins of metamorphic rocks that became mineralized by hydrothermal activity. It occurs mostly in association with muscovite, schorl, albite, quartz, microcline, fluorite, smoky quartz, cleavelandite and morganite.

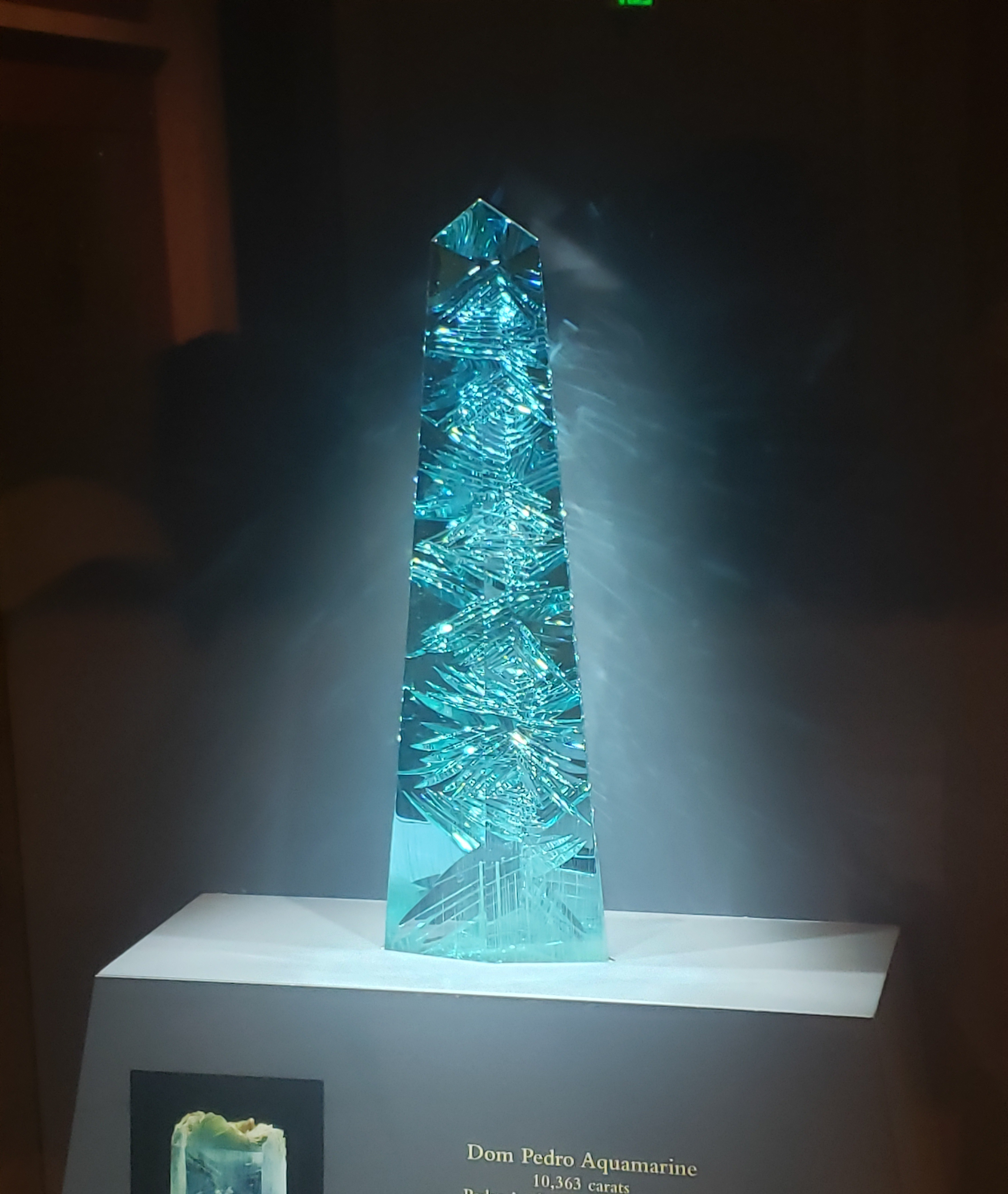
Dom Pedro aquamarine in the National Museum of Natural History, Washington, D.C.

The largest known example is the Dom Pedro aquamarine found in Pedra Azul, Minas Gerais, Brazil, in the late 1980's. It weighs roughly 4.6 pounds, cut from a 100-pound aquamarine crystal, and measures 10,363 carats. It resides in the National Museum of Natural History in Washington.

== Mining and extraction ==
The initial stages of the aquamarine mining process involve prospecting and exploration. Geological mapping, remote sensing, mapping, sampling, and other methods are used by geologists and mining firms to locate potentially aquamarine-bearing geological formations and structures. Preparation of the site is the next step, which includes removing any vegetation, leveling the land, and constructing the facilities - such as access roads and workspaces. It is possible to mine aquamarine using both open-pit and underground techniques. This will depend on the size of the operation, the features of the deposit, and environmental conditions.

The most popular technique for extracting aquamarine on a large scale is open-pit mining. In order to reveal the aquamarine-bearing ore, the soil, vegetation, and rock cover must be removed. The ore is extracted using trucks, bulldozers, and excavators, to remove the material.

Underground mining may occasionally be used to obtain aquamarine reserves. This process entails digging shafts and tunnels to reach the ore bodies or veins that contain gems. When the aquamarine deposit is deep or the surrounding rock is too hard for open-pit extraction, underground mining is used, even though it can be more difficult and expensive than open-pit mining.

After extraction, the ore containing aquamarine is delivered to a processing plant. To extract the aquamarine crystals from the surrounding rock and other minerals, the ore is crushed, processed, and occasionally cleaned. The aquamarine can be concentrated and purified using a variety of methods, such as magnetic separation, froth flotation, and gravity separation.

The aquamarine crystals are then sorted according to size, shape, color, and clarity following the initial processing. The gemstones are assessed and graded by gemologists and experts according to predetermined standards, such as the four C's (color, clarity, cut, and carat weight).

== Care and maintenance ==
Aquamarine is classified as a durable gem, however, it may still be damaged. In storage, it is advised to place it on its own, without the interruption of other gemstones to prevent scratches. Warm soapy water and a soft brush are the best ways to clean this gemstone, however, ultrasonic cleaners are relatively safe for aquamarine.

== Notable examples ==
Aquamarine	Origin	Size	Location	Description
Dom Pedro aquamarine	Found in Pedra Azul, Minas Gerais, Brazil. Mined in 1980.	10,363 carats	National Museum of Natural History, Washington, D.C.	World's largest cut aquamarine. Named after the first two emperors of Brazil, Pedro I and Pedro II.
The Roosevelt Aquamarine	Given to Eleanor Roosevelt in 1936.	1,298 carats	Franklin D. Roosevelt Presidential Library and Museum	Given to US First Lady Eleanor Roosevelt when she and President Roosevelt visited Brazil. It is known as the second largest cut specimen of aquamarine, behind the Dom Pedro.
The Hirsch Aquamarine	Once owned by Louis XV.	109.92 carats	Unknown	Once owned by the French King Louis XV.
Queen Elizabeth's Aquamarine Tiara	Given to Queen Elizabeth in 1953.	Unknown	British royal family	In 1957, she purchased this tiara from Garrad, to match another aquamarine set she had received from Brazilian President Getúlio Vargas in 1953 as a coronation gift.
Meghan Markle's Aquamarine Ring	Once owned by Princess Diana.	>30 carats	Meghan Markle	Received from Prince Harry during their wedding, this ring once belonged to Princess Diana.
The Schlumberger Bow The Schlumberger Bow	Owned by Tiffany & Co.	148.5 carats	Field Museum of Natural History, Chicago.	Was part of a collection owned by Tiffany & Co. Purchased in 1984 to be placed in the Field Museum.

== See also ==
- List of gemstones
- List of minerals
