= Spinal Cord Injuries Australia =

Spinal Cord Injuries Australia (SCIA) is an Australian non-government organisation providing advocacy and services to people with spinal cord injury (paraplegia, quadriplegia) and similar conditions.

== History ==
SCIA was established in 1967 as the Australian Quadriplegic Association (AQA) by a group of patients in Prince Henry Hospital in Sydney, Australia. They were unable to leave hospital because there was no accommodation or services to support them in the community. AQA was renamed in 2003.

Under SCIA's constitution at least 50% of its board of directors must have a spinal cord injury or similar condition.

The founding members were Trevor Annetts, Tom Clarke, Graeme Dunne, David Fox, Peter Harris, George Mamo, Jim McGrath, Robert McKenzie, Alan Moore, John Munday, Cecil Murr, Brian Shirt, Paul Sorgo, Stan Wanless, and Warren Mowbray. David Fox was the first president. They were encouraged to set up an organisation by social worker Gary Garrison, supported by Dr George Burniston.

They were successful in securing accommodation at Bon Accord Nursing Home in Coogee and later established Ashton House in Maroubra. AQA developed a number of other supported group accommodation residences and transitional accommodation services.

== Services ==
Services provided by SCIA today are information, advocacy, accessible accommodation, NDIS Plan Management and Support Coordination, employment, peer and family support and NeuroMoves, an exercise and therapy service for people living with a neurological condition or physical disability.

The SCIA Customer Connect team responds to more than 850 calls a year from disabled Australians and their families, and maintains a library of disability resources at the SCIA office in Sydney, New South Wales. the SCIA online Resource Library provides a wide variety of resources for people with spinal cord injuries and their families, containing articles and contact details of medical, support and advisory services. A regional information team also provides individual support and advice for people with spinal cord injury in coastal and inland NSW.

SCIA advocates for independent living services that would support people with high level care needs in their own homes, such as public housing, personal care, housekeeping, equipment supply and income support. Over time these were introduced by federal and state governments. SCIA also campaigns for increased employment opportunities for people with disabilities, increased funding for disability equipment programs and for the provision of more wheelchair-accessible public transport.

SCIA services are funded by State and Federal government grants, public donations, fundraising activities and commercial contracts including SCIA's Geo and Data coding for the Transport for New South Wales Centre for Road Safety and the Teamsafe program.
