= Hilton Valencia =

Skyscraper in Spain

Coordinates: 39°29′40″N 0°24′04″W

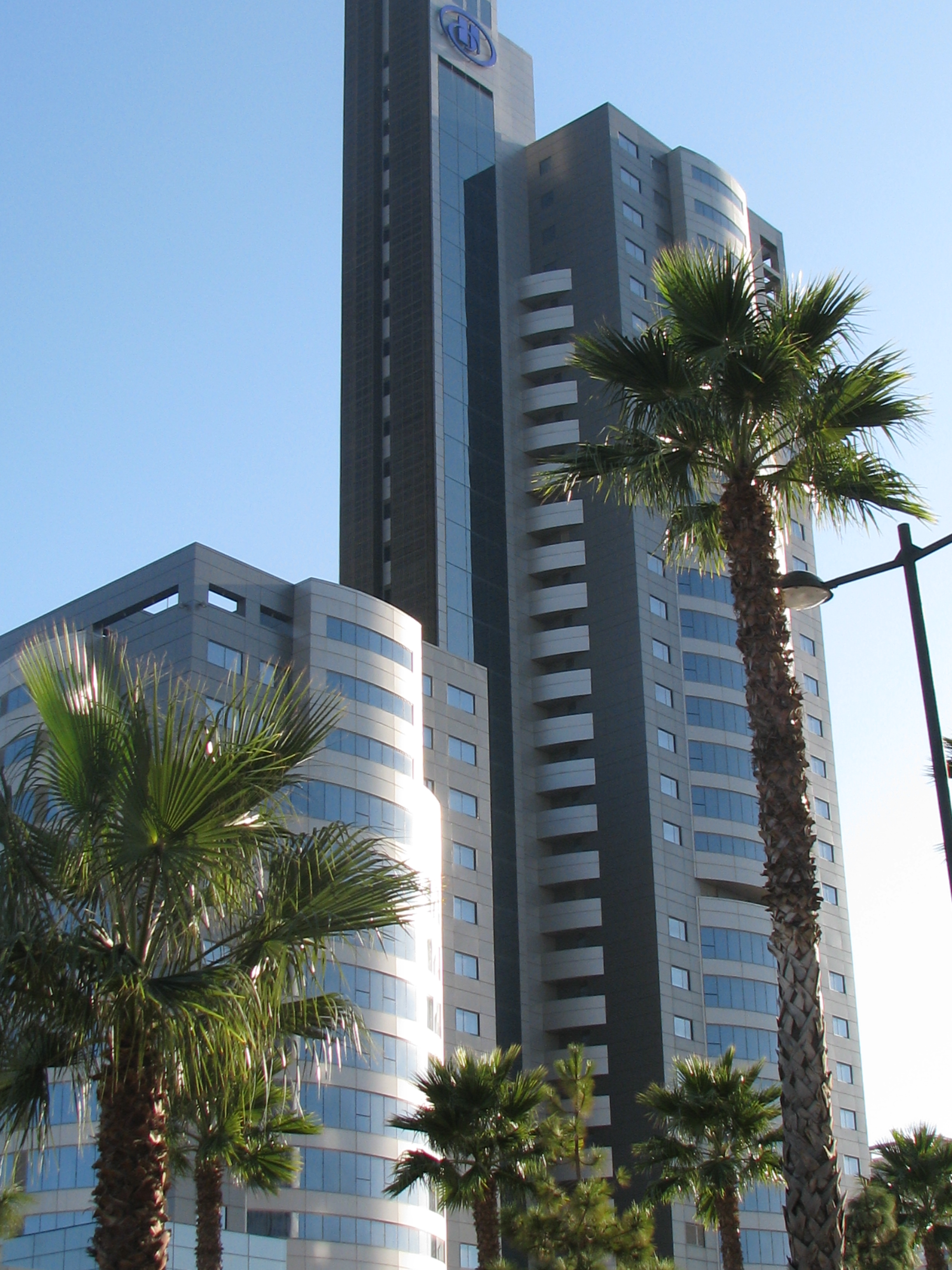
- Interactive map of the Hilton Valencia area

General information
- Status: Completed
- Type: hotel
- Location: Valencia, Spain
- Construction started: 2002
- Completed: 2006

Height
- Height: 117 m (384 ft)

Technical details
- Floor count: 35

Design and construction
- Architect: Norman Foster

Hilton Valencia (Torre Hilton, Hotel Hilton in Valencia) is a skyscraper and hotel in Valencia, Spain. Completed in 2006, has 35 floors and rises 117 metres. It was part of Hilton Hotels.

While the building is still standing and continues to be used as an office building, it is no longer a Hilton Hotel, after being taken over and renamed Hotel Melia Valencia

It's the tallest skyscraper in Valencia.

== See also ==
- List of tallest buildings in Valencia
