= Richard T. Liddicoat =

American gemologist

Richard T. Liddicoat, Jr.
- Born: March 2, 1918; Kearsarge, Michigan, U.S.
- Died: July 23, 2002 (aged 84); Santa Monica, California
- Other name: "Father of Modern Gemology"
- Education: University of Michigan
- Occupations: Gemologist, Chairman of Board of Governors of Gemological Institute of America

Richard T. Liddicoat, Jr. (March 2, 1918 – July 23, 2002) was an American gemologist. An educator in gemology, he contributed in the area of diamond quality grading and gem identification. Liddicoat was the Chairman of the Board of Governors at the Gemological Institute of America (GIA).

== Early life and education ==
On March 2, 1918, Liddicoat was born as Richard Thomas Liddicoat, Jr. in Kearsarge, Michigan to Richard T. and Carmen Beryl (Williams) Liddicoat. Both of his grandfathers were miners from Cornwall.

In 1939, Liddicoat earned a bachelor's degree in geology from University of Michigan. In 1940, Liddicoat earned a master's degree in mineralogy from University of Michigan. During World War II, he attended the California Institute of Technology where he obtained a Master's degree in Meteorology in 1944.

== Career ==
On June 28, 1940, Liddicoat joined the staff of GIA as an Assistant Director of Education. About a year later, in fall 1941, Liddicoat helped develop the Diamolite, and also published, alongside Robert M. Shipley, his first article for Gems & Gemology; "A Solution to Diamond Color Grading Problems".

After serving in the United States Navy during WWII, he returned to GIA as Director of Research in February 1946. 18 months later, he published his first edition of the Handbook of Gem Identification. In the next year, he was named Assistant Director of GIA, and in 1949, he was named director of GIA New York and GIA Gem Trade Laboratory.

In April 1952, he was also named executive director of GIA, and then later assumed editorship of Gems & Gemology. Exactly a year later, in April 1953, he officially introduced the GIA diamond grading system as part of a new educational class in New York. Successfully, the GIA Gem Trade Laboratory issued its first Diamond Grading Reports. That led him to co-author the first edition of The Diamond Dictionary, in 1960. That also led him to devise the "rapid sight" system for estimating diamond cutting quality. He also later co-authored the first edition of The Jeweler's Manual.

In 1970, Liddicoat launched a series of extension education classes in Israel taught by Glenn Nord, making GIA's first global outreach. Further expanding that outreach, he launched the first GIA gemology courses in Japan the following year. He received the 1976 American Gem Society's Robert M. Shipley Award, and created the GIA Research Department under the leadership of Dr. D. Vincent Manson.

In Spring 1981, he published his first issue of Gems & Gemology in an expanded and redesigned format. The next year, he created the GIA Alumni Association under Robert Earnest. Chairs GIA's first International Gemological Symposium in Los Angeles. In 1983, he stepped down as President of GIA; named chairman of the GIA Board of Governors, and named Honorary Member of AGTA. He was then named 1984 Man of the Year by the Consolidated Jewelers Association of New York, also being named a Founding Organizer of ICA.

=== Architect of the international diamond grading system ===
In 1953, Liddicoat introduced the GIA diamond grading system - a practical approach to grading the quality of colorless to light yellow polished diamonds on the basis of color, clarity, and cut. A central feature was the D-to-Z color grading system for faceted colorless to light yellow diamonds—the vast majority of diamonds seen in the trade.

Beginning in 1953, GIA instructors taught this grading system to hundreds of students so they could evaluate their own diamonds. Subsequently, many of these students asked GIA to set up a procedure whereby they could submit their grading worksheets, and eventually the diamonds themselves, for an independent assessment. And so, GIA issued the first GIA Diamond Grading Report in 1955.

In 1942, as Director of Education, Liddicoat developed an intensive one-week lab class that was launched at the American Gem Society (AGS) Conclaves in Philadelphia and Chicago. The class gave jewelers the opportunity to work with equipment in a classroom setting under the guidance of GIA instructors.

The number of international students grew under Liddicoat's leadership. In 1970, he arranged for instructor Glenn Nord to teach in Israel. The following year, Kenzo Yamamoto and Yoshiko Doi began teaching GIA classes in Japan (since then, nearly 3,000 graduate gemologists have been trained at GIA's Japanese affiliate). From these early beginnings, GIA has established 13 schools in 14 countries.

=== Literary outreach ===
Liddicoat believed in disseminating information to students and the gem and jewelry trade alike. His first article in Gems & Gemology, co-authored with Robert M. Shipley in 1941, was "A solution to diamond color grading problems." Liddicoat became editor of Gems & Gemology in 1952, eventually serving as editor-in-chief until his death in 2002. He led a procession of notable mineralogists, gemologists, and other scientists who contributed groundbreaking articles to the journal. Over the years, he would write more than 40 articles, editorials, and news items for the journal.

Liddicoat also participated in writing three important books for gemologists. The first edition of Richard Liddicoat's Handbook of Gem Identification, published in 1947, presented "simple and often conclusive" tests to identify gems. Now in its 12th edition (4th printing), it is one of the most widely read textbooks in gemology. The Diamond Dictionary, first published in 1960 and now in its 3rd edition (1993), provides a standard reference for diamond terminology. The Jewelers' Manual, a handy reference guide to gemology and jewelry for the working jeweler, was first published in 1964 and is now in its 3rd edition (1989).

Liddicoat's contributions to spreading gem and jewelry knowledge were immortalized with the creation of the Richard T. Liddicoat Gemological Library and Information Center in 1989. Although Shipley had begun a library in the very first days of GIA, Liddicoat was the one who envisioned a world-class, state-of-the-art library that would serve not only GIA staff and students, but also jewelers, gemologists, and consumers worldwide. Today, the Liddicoat Library is the largest gemology and jewelry library in the world. At almost 9,000 square feet (840 m^{2}), it houses over 30,000 volumes and journals as well as extensive collections of photos, videotapes, and other media resources.

=== Research and gem identification ===
When Robert M. Shipley set up his Los Angeles laboratory in the early 1930s, the Institute's resources were devoted to identifying gems and to documenting the properties and techniques that would aid in their identification. Late in 1948, Shipley assigned Liddicoat to New York to lead the expansion of that new branch. As director of GIA New York and the GIA Gem Trade Laboratory, Liddicoat was responsible for integrating the facilities of the two labs. The early identification work was typically a group effort among staff members who became known as the "Liddicoat brain trust."

Liddicoat presided over four decades of innovation in gem instrument development at GIA, and established gem instruments as one of the Institute's highest priorities. In addition to his early work with Shipley to develop the Diamolite, Liddicoat's scientific background enabled him to foster the development of instruments such as the prism spectroscope and the ProportionScope. His objective throughout instrument development at GIA was to provide jewelers with practical tools that could help them in the day-to-day operation of identifying gemstones.

By the 1970s, the GIA Gem Trade Laboratory staff was examining large numbers of gemstones, including the grading of diamonds and the identification of colored stones and pearls. Sensing the need for a group of scientists who would focus on the many emerging technical challenges in gemology, Liddicoat formally established the current GIA Research Department in 1976.

== Personal life and awards ==
In 1977, Liddicoat received Modern Jeweler Magazine's Lifetime Achievement Award, also receiving the Morris B. Zale Lifetime Achievement Award, and became the first Honorary Lifetime Member of the Gem Testing Laboratory of Great Britain. In 1989, he was honored with the dedication of the Richard T. Liddicoat Gemological Library and Information Center at GIA.

He was named into the National Home Study Council's Hall of Fame in 1991, and in the same decade named GIA Chairman of the Board for Life in 1992, and received GIA League of Honor Lifetime Achievement Award.

In June 2000, a life-size bronze statue based on Liddicoat was created by staff member Michael Clary, placed at the entrance of GIA Carlsbad. In July 2001, he received the AGS Lifetime Achievement Award.

Liddicoat's wife was Mary Imogene Hibbard, who died in 1995. On July 23, 2002, Richard T. Liddicoat died at his home in Santa Monica, California of cancer.

== Bibliography ==
- Shipley R.M., Liddicoat R.T. Jr. (1941) A solution to diamond color grading problems. Gems & Gemology, Vol. 3, No. 11, pp. 162–168.
- Liddicoat R.T. Jr., Ball S.H. (1941) The mining of gems and ornamental stones by American Indians. Gems & Gemology, Vol. 3, No. 12, pp. 178–181.
- Liddicoat R.T. Jr. (1946) Identification of synthetic gems: Part 1—The detection of synthetic corundum. Gems & Gemology, Vol. 5, No. 7, pp. 349–354.
- Liddicoat R.T. Jr. (1946) New fluorescence test for doublets and triplets. Gems & Gemology, Vol. 5, No. 5, pp. 303–307.
- Liddicoat R.T. Jr. (1947) Handbook of Gem Identification. Gemological Institute of America, Los Angeles, CA, 283 pp.
- Liddicoat R.T. Jr. (1951) Heavy-media separation proves effective. Gems & Gemology, Vol. 7, No. 4, pp. 116–119.
- Liddicoat R.T. Jr. (1955) Diamond selling practices. Gems & Gemology, Vol. 8, No. 6, pp. 165–171.
- Liddicoat R.T. Jr., Crowningshield G.R. (1955) Strontium titanate. Gems & Gemology, Vol. 8, No. 5, pp. 148, 156.
- Liddicoat R.T. Jr. (1955) Techniques employed in the identification of gemstones. American Mineralogist, Vol. 40, No. 11/12, pp. 1119–1127.
- Liddicoat R.T. Jr. (1956) Diamond selling practices in America. Journal of Gemmology, Vol. 5, No. 6, pp. 310–318.
- Liddicoat R.T. Jr. (1957) Beauty versus excess weight. Sonderheft zur Zeitschrift der Deutschen Gesellschaft für Edelsteinkunde, Vol. 20, No. 79, pp. 58–59.
- Liddicoat R.T. Jr. (1957) Are present diamond rules adequate? Gems & Gemology, Vol. 9, No. 2, pp. 38–42.
- Copeland L.L., Liddicoat R.T. Jr., Benson L.B. Jr., Martin J.G.M., Crowningshield G.R. (1960) The Diamond Dictionary. Gemological Institute of America, Los Angeles, CA, 361 pp.
- Liddicoat R.T. Jr. (1961) A report on European laboratories. Gems & Gemology, Vol. 10, No. 5, pp. 131–141, 157–158.
- Liddicoat R.T. Jr. (1962) Developing powers of observation in gem testing. Gems & Gemology, Vol. 10, No. 10, pp. 291–303, 319.
- Liddicoat R.T. Jr. (1962) Developments and highlights at the Gem Trade Lab in Los Angeles. Gems & Gemology, Vol. 10, No. 8, pp. 247–251. [The first in a series of “Lab Notes” sections authored and/or edited by Richard T. Liddicoat.]
- Liddicoat R.T. Jr. (1962) Rapid sight estimates of diamond cutting quality, Parts 1 and 2. Gems & Gemology, Vol. 10, Nos. 11 and 12, pp. 323–335 and 365–375.
- Liddicoat R.T. Jr. (1964) The GIA Photoscope. Gems & Gemology, Vol. 11, No. 7, pp. 195–199.
- Liddicoat R.T. Jr. (1964) The International Gemmological Conference in Vienna. Gems & Gemology, Vol. 11, No. 7, pp. 200–209.
- Liddicoat R.T. Jr., Copeland L.L. (1964) The Jewelers' Manual. Gemological Institute of America, Los Angeles, CA, 361 pp.
- Liddicoat R.T. Jr., McKague H.L. (1966) De Beers and Kaplan make important gift to GIA. Gems & Gemology, Vol. 12, No. 2, pp. 35–42.
- Liddicoat R.T. Jr. (1966) The International Gemmological Conference. Gems & Gemology, Vol. 12, No. 4, pp. 99–102, 126.
- Liddicoat R.T. Jr. (1967) Diamond proportion grading and the new ProportionScope. Gems & Gemology, Vol. 12, No. 5, pp. 130–136.
- Liddicoat R.T. Jr. (1967) Cultured pearl farming and marketing in Japan. Lapidary Journal, Vol. 21, No. 5, pp. 662–666.
- Liddicoat R.T. Jr. (1967) Cultured pearl farming and marketing. Gems & Gemology, Vol. 12, No. 6, pp. 162–172.
- Liddicoat R.T. Jr., Crowningshield G.R. (1968) More about zoisite, a new gem sensation. Lapidary Journal, Vol. 22, No. 6, pp. 734–740.
- Liddicoat R.T. Jr. (1970) The Russian diamond industry. Gems & Gemology, Vol. 13, No. 8, pp. 259–265.
- Liddicoat R.T. Jr. (1970) Summary of the 1970 International Gemmological Conference. Gems & Gemology, Vol. 13, No. 7, pp. 206–220.
- Liddicoat R.T. Jr. (1971) Diamond prices a century ago. Gems & Gemology, Vol. 13, No. 10, pp. 325–327.
- Liddicoat R.T. Jr. (1974) Industry developments including Cape Town Kimberlite Conference. AGS Guilds, May–June, pp. 11–13.
- Liddicoat R.T. Jr., Fryer C.W. (1974) Three new gem materials. Zeitschrift der Deutschen Gemmologischen Gesellschaft, Vol. 23, No. 2, pp. 125–127.
- Liddicoat R.T. Jr. (1976) The mid-1970s GIA explosion. AGS Guilds, Vol. 30, May–June, pp. 20–21.
- Liddicoat R.T. Jr., Koivula J.I. (1978) Synthetic cubic stabilized zirconia. Gems & Gemology, Vol. 16, No. 2, pp. 58–61.
- Liddicoat R.T. Jr. (1981) A brief summary of gemmological instrument evolution. Journal of Gemmology, Vol. 17, No. 8, pp. 568–583.
- Liddicoat R.T. Jr. (1981) An introduction to the new Gems & Gemology. Gems & Gemology, Vol. 17, No. 1, p. 1. (The first of several editorials Liddicoat wrote for the new format of Gems & Gemology.)
- Liddicoat R.T. Jr. (1982) The development of gemological training in America by GIA. In D. M. Eash, Ed., International Gemological Symposium, Proceedings, Gemological Institute of America, Santa Monica, CA, pp. 5–11.
- Kane R.E., Liddicoat R.T. Jr. (1985) The Biron hydrothermal synthetic emerald. Gems & Gemology, Vol. 21, No. 3, pp. 156–170.
- Liddicoat R.T., Boyajian W.E. (1990) The 1980s in review: New realities of the gem and jewelry industry. Gems & Gemology, Vol. 26, No. 1, pp. 1–2.
- Liddicoat R.T. (1991) Development of GIA's diamond grading system. In Focus, Vol. 10, No. 2, pp. 13–15.
- Liddicoat R.T. (1991) How end of G.I. Bill legislation gave birth to the GIA grading system. Diamond World Review, No. 63 (May), pp. 20, 27.
- Liddicoat R.T., Keller A.S. (1999) Gems & Gemology turns 65. Gems & Gemology, Vol. 35, No. 4, p. 173.
