= Sallie Morton =

American jeweler

- Sallie Morton, from a 1962 newspaper
- Born: Sallie Miller; November 8, 1925; Reno, Nevada, U.S.
- Died: October 24, 2017 (aged 91); Los Gatos, California, U.S.
- Occupations: Jeweler, gemologist
- Known for: President of the American Gem Society (1977 to 1979)

Sallie Morton (November 8, 1925 – October 24, 2017), born Sallie Miller, was an American jeweler and gemologist. In 1977, she became the first female president of the American Gem Society.

== Early life ==
Sallie Miller was born in Reno, Nevada, one of the six daughters of Meredith Raines Miller and Sadie Phillips Miller. She attended from Reno High School, and graduated from the University of Oregon in with a degree in accounting. She later studied gemology, earning certification as a gemologist in 1962. At the time, there were only five American women with such certification.

== Career ==
Finding limited employment as an accountant, Morton worked with her husband at his watch repair shop in San Jose, California. Their business grew into Morton Jewelers, with various locations around San Jose and Los Gatos, California. As a gemologist, she lectured internationally, and toured mines, factories, and private collections in Australia, Africa, Asia, and South America. "I go primarily to see how jewelry is made, not to buy," she explained in 1978. In 1986, she was inducted into the Hall of Fame of the Women's Jewelry Association. Morton sold her business, Morton Jewelers, when she retired in 1993.

From 1977 to 1979, Morton was president of the American Gem Society, the first woman to hold that executive position. She served on the Society's board from 1980 to 1992. In 1982, she was the first woman recipient of the Society's Robert M. Shipley Award. She took the lead in raising funds to replace the Society's San Francisco headquarters, which were destroyed in a 1983 fire. She was a member of the editorial board of the Society's journal, Gems & Gemology. In 2014, the Society launched the Sallie Morton Award.

Morton was active in the Rotary Club of San Jose, as one of its first female members; she also served on the board of the Santa Clara Girl Scout Council.

== Personal life ==
Sallie Miller married watchmaker MacDonald G. Morton in 1949. They had a son, Philip. She died in 2017, aged 91 years, from mesothelioma.
