= Reno High School =

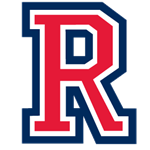

Location
- 395 Booth St; Reno, Nevada 89509; United States; 39.517464°N 119.828081°W

Information
- Type: Public secondary
- Established: 1879
- Principal: Mike Nakashima
- Staff: 69.50 (on an FTE basis)
- Grades: 9–12
- Enrollment: 1,741 (2024–2025)
- Student to teacher ratio: 25.05
- Campus type: Suburban
- Colors: Red and Blue
- Team name: Huskies
- Rivals: Robert McQueen High School, Bishop Manogue Catholic High School
- Website: reno.washoeschools.net

Reno High School (RHS) is a public secondary school in Reno, Nevada, United States. It is a part of the Washoe County School District. The school's teams are known as the Reno Huskies, and the school colors are red and blue.

== History ==
Reno High was the first high school in Reno, which is celebrated by its slogan: "Reno High - Older than Reno".

High school students in Reno in the 1860s were originally taught in the basement of a building on the corner of First and Virginia Streets, on the future site of the Mapes Hotel. Today, there is a city plaza at that location, which is across the street from the Reno City Hall. In 1869 High school students were moved to a one-room school. In 1879, due to Reno's expanding population, a larger high school, called "Central School," was built near Arlington and Fourth Streets. This was commonly referred to as "Reno High School", and 1879 is the generally accepted year of the school's founding.

In 1910, a fire in the chemistry lab destroyed the school's main building. The school was rebuilt in downtown Reno in 1912, at a location currently occupied by the former Sundowner hotel-casino (a portion of which is now a condominium complex).

In 1951, Reno High was relocated to new facilities, on 71 acres, the campus located on Booth and Foster Streets, just south of the Truckee River and near Idlewild Park.

== Extracurricular activities ==
=== Athletics ===
Reno High has won numerous state varsity championships in many sports. The boys' cross country team has been the most dominant, winning 12 state championships (including five consecutive wins). The girls' basketball team won the state championship in 2001, then won back-to-back state and region championships in 2013 and 2014. The Reno High football team won the Nevada state football title in 2003, the Reno baseball team won the state championship in 2004, and the boys' basketball team won the championship in 2006, knocking off North Las Vegas' Rancho High School.

The Reno Huskies compete in the High Desert League of the Northern Nevada 4A Region, which is the large-school level of varsity sports in Nevada.

Since 2003, the Reno High boys' sports varsity teams have won Nevada state championships in football, basketball, baseball, track and field, swimming, diving, tennis, and snow skiing.

On Friday, February 22, 2008, the Reno Huskies defeated Cheyenne High of Las Vegas 76 to 72, for their second state basketball championship in three seasons. The Huskies won at least one state championship in seven different sports in every year from 2002 to 2008.

In 1986, Reno High football placekicker Dirk Borgognone set a world record for the longest high school football field goal . The 68 yard long field goal, which was kicked in a game at Sparks High School is the second-longest in organized American football at any class level, including the NFL, and was just short of Ove Johansson's 69-yard field goal in 1976, for NAIA college school Abilene Christian.

Former Reno High track and cross country star Inga Thompson is a three time Olympian in Cycling Road Racing and a three time UCI Road World Championships silver medalist. Reno High cross country runner Marie (Mel) Lawrence holds the U.S. high school record in the 2,000 m and 3,000 m steeplechase.

=== Orchestras ===
Reno High currently has three performing orchestras:

- Chamber Orchestra
- Sinfonia
- Concert Orchestra

The Chamber Orchestra tours each year, participating in college level master-classes and festivals at schools and Universities such as Stanford University, San Francisco State University, San Jose State University and University of the Pacific. Members of the Orchestras audition for and consistently participate in the Reno Philharmonic Youth Symphonies, the Washoe County Honor Orchestra, and the Nevada State Honor Orchestra.

=== Bands ===
- Wind Ensemble
- Jazz Band
- Concert Band
- Pep Band

The Reno High Jazz Band, Wind Ensemble and Concert Band are ranked highly in the district, winning festivals year round.

=== Choirs ===
- Vocal Motion
- Chorale
- Mixed Choir

=== Performing arts ===
The Reno High School Theater Program, known as the 'Booth Street Players', presents three to four shows a year, along with outside school community performances. The fall production is a play, and the spring production is a musical. Past shows have included Little Shop of Horrors, Our Town, Grease, The Boy Friend, and Pippin ('Pippin' included students trained in silk aerial acrobatics).

=== Other activities ===
The Speech and Debate team has consecutively won the state championship for 31 years in a row (as of 2026), as well as this, they won the 2020 "Covid Cup". The lack of in person competition prompted the Northern Nevada Forensic League (NNFL) to cancel the usual sweepstakes, instead opting to have a "Covid Cup" for that year only. The "Covid Cup" applicable competitions all took place online with streaming video. In 2019 the Debate Team attained 1,000 points in league competition, a first.

The most recent club added to Reno High (as of 2026) is poetry club. While the school historically would publish a poetry magazine once per year, this tradition has been left in the past. With the newest club leader, plans to restart the publication are in the works, but nothing has been realized yet.

Publications

- Re-Wa-Ne — school yearbook
- The Red & Blue — monthly school newspaper
- The Mirror — school literary magazine (publication ceased in 2008)

== Notable alumni ==
- Walter S. Baring Jr. (1929) - U.S. congressman from Nevada
- Josh Barrett (2003) - safety for the Denver Broncos and the New England Patriots
- Dirk Borgognone (1985) - football kicker for the Green Bay Packers
- Shawn Boskie (1986) - major league baseball pitcher
- Frederic Joseph DeLongchamps (1900) - Nevada State Architect; designer of many well known Nevada buildings
- Frank Fahrenkopf (1957) - political adviser to President Reagan and chairman of the Republican National Committee
- Skylar Hales (2020) – professional baseball player, Texas Rangers organization
- Sean "Hollywood" Hamilton (freshman year only) - national radio personality
- Garrett Hampson (2013) - professional baseball player, on the Colorado Rockies baseball team
- Ray Handley (1962) - head coach of the New York Giants
- Ale Kaho (2018) - linebacker for the Washington Commanders
- Massimo Manca (1981) - kicker for the Cincinnati Bengals
- Don Manoukian (1953) - offensive lineman for the Oakland Raiders and pro wrestler
- Patrick Anthony McCarran (1897) - United States senator from Nevada
- Sallie Morton (1940s), first female president, American Gem Society
- Dorothy Papadakos (1978) - concert organist, playwright, and author
- John Savage - UCLA Bruins baseball head coach
- Hillary Schieve - mayor of Reno, Nevada
- Ben Stevenson (2013) - American water polo player, 2020 Summer Olympics US Mens National Team
- Payton Talbott (2017) - professional mixed martial artist competing for the UFC.
- Inga Thompson - three-time Olympic Games cyclist
- Willy Vlautin (1986) - author of the novels The Motel Life, Northline, Lean on Pete; also the lead vocalist and songwriter for alt-country band Richmond Fontaine
- Dawn Wells (1956) - actress, Wells starred in Gilligan's Island as Mary Ann
