= German Gemmological Association =

The German Gemmological Association (DGemG) is a nonprofit, technical-scientific association in the field of gemmology, located in the European gemstone center Idar-Oberstein. The two most important points of the statutes are the promotion of gemmology as science and technique and the development of information and education in the field of gemmology.

== History ==
The DGemG was founded by the gemstone dealer and gemmologist Georg Otto Wild from Idar-Oberstein in 1932. Therefore, the DGemG is one of the three oldest gemmological institutes worldwide. Gemmological courses have been offered since 1935 and since 1952 the journal ”GEMMOLOGIE. Journal of the German Gemmological Association” has been published.

Beginning in 1968, the education was systematized in three fields: Gemmology of coloured stones, grading of diamonds and pearls/organic substances. The fundamental research and applied gemmology was done at the University of Heidelberg.

In 1969 the “Professor-Dr.-Karl-Schlossmacher-Stiftung” was founded by the DGemG, which was renamed as “Deutsche Stiftung Edelsteinforschung” (DSEF) in 1979. In 1975, the new building of the German Gemmological Association and facilities of the German Gemmological Education Center – German public vocational development office for Gemmology - were opened in the Professor-Schlossmacher-Straße. The international qualification F.G.G. (Fellow of the German Gemmological Association)was introduced in 1986 to support economy-related gemmological projects by the financial district parliament of Rhineland-Palatinate. In 2000 the gemmological courses and refresher-courses were improved to be more oriented towards the branch of trade. Nine years later followed a certification of the Association as a member of the public vocational development program (AZWV in Germany).

== Cooperations ==
The German Gemmological Association fosters intense cooperations with geoscientific institutions of German Universities regarding research and education, e.g. with the universities in Mainz, Heidelberg, Hamburg, Würzburg, Bonn, with the “Fachhochschule” (college) of Rhineland-Palatinate and other gemmological institutions and laboratories world-wide.

Employees of the DGemG act as representatives of the German gemmology at international fairs, meetings, collaborations and boards of the gemstone- and jewellery market, like the international gemmological conference (IGC), the International Coloured Gemstone Association (ICA), the World Jewellery Confederation CIBJO, the Gemstone Industry and Laboratory Conference (GILC) and the Federation for European Education in Gemmology (FEEG).

== Membership ==
The attainment of the membership of the German Gemmological Association is open for everyone. It includes

- Access to industry-related, gemmological lectures and events, e.g. conferences, meetings and gemstone-fairs.
- Receipt of the “Gemmologie”-magazine of the German Gemmological Association with various articles regarding gemological topics.
- Two meetings every year, where members foster their knowledge about current proceedings in gemology. Professional lectures held by world-known scientists and gemologists are backed up practical exercises and hands-on-workshop.
- The opportunity to acquire the title “Fachmitglied der Deutschen Gemmologischen Gesellschaft” (Fellow of the German Gemmological Association), in short: F.G.G.

Eligible people have passed the educational programs of the DGemG and are willing to continuously improve their knowledge through special courses every five years.

== Magazine of the DGemG ==
The magazine „GEMMOLOGIE – Magazine of the German Gemmological Association“ is a technical-scientific publication for the members of the Association. It is issued regularly since 1952, currently available with two issues a year. It covers current proceedings in the gemstone-field, results and research-topics of the laboratory and short informations.

== Educational programs ==
About 30.000 participants from over 80 countries took part in the seminars and educational programs of the DGemG, which are offered in German and English. They are divided in gemology, diamond grading and pearls/organic substances. After passing all three educational series, which takes about four months full-time, the participant will obtain the confirmation to issue gemological reports himself and is eligible to become a fellow of the German Gemmological Association (F.G.G). The German Gemmological research- and educational-center is seated in the midst of the traditional gemstone-metropole, Idar-Oberstein and owns seminar-rooms, research labs and an educational gemstone-collection.

== Research ==
The German Gemmological Association supports basic as well as applied research in all fields of gemology, especially through funding the German Gemstone Research Foundation (DSEF). Major aspects of the research include:

- Identifying properties of new gemstone-materials
- Understanding locality-specific and genetical characteristics of gemstones
- Differentiable marks of natural and synthetic gemstones, their imitations and artificial products.
- Analysing of characteristic traits of artificially treated and enhanced gemstone-materials.

All the results are worked into the current technological transfer of the market. This can be through publishing the results in the own magazine “GEMMOLOGIE”, lectures and meetings in Germany (own annual symposia) and abroad. The educational programs are always updated with the results. The DSEF-lab fulfills all requirements to a modern, international service-institute for the gemstone-market. It characterizes gemstones, analyses the naturality and possible artificial treatments, issues gemstone-certificates and it can do research on any aspect of gemology with a professionally equipped laboratory and a research network to universities. Analysis of color-enhancements of diamonds, also the color-reasons of colored gemstones and the analysis of pearls and cultured pearls are common work done by this lab.
