= Gemmological Association of Great Britain =

- Established: 1931
- Location: London, United Kingdom

The Gemmological Association of Great Britain (Gem-A) is an international gemmology education and qualifications body based in the United Kingdom.

== History ==
Gem-A emerged from an Education Committee set up by The National Association of Goldsmiths (NAG) in 1908. As the study of gemmology grew in popularity, NAG established the Gemmological Association as an independent branch in October 1931, under the successive presidencies of Henry Miers, William Bragg and Herbert Smith. The organisation was subsequently renamed the Gemmological Association of Great Britain in 1838, before being incorporated in 1947. The association now trades under the name of Gem-A, following the closure of the organisation's gem testing lab in 2007 (and the organisation's subsequent refocus on research and education).

The Gemmological Association of Great Britain is a registered United Kingdom-based charity and its gemmology and diamond courses are taught in some 25 countries worldwide.

=== Coat of arms ===
One of the most common symbols used to denote the association, the coat of arms is based upon a design submitted by H. Ellis Tomlinson on behalf of the association in 1966. Mr Tomlinson, who was also responsible for the design of the arms of the National Association of Goldsmiths a few years prior, combined mediaeval heraldry with colours, language and ornament to create what is now a well-known symbol denoting the association. It was not until 1967, when the association received the official grant of arms from the King of Arms under royal authority, that it became the logos prentice of the association and all its related activities.

The Gem-A coat of arms itself is composed of a shield, crest and motto.

==== The shield ====
The shield is the focal part of the coat of arms. In its centre is a gold jewelled book representing the study of gemmology. Above this is a rose-cut diamond within a circle, suggesting the examination of gems under magnification. To each side are octahedral diamond crystals, indicating gems as found, and below is a pearl-set ring representing gem-set jewellery.

==== The crest ====
The crest is in the form of a lynx. This species of wildcat is traditionally renowned for its keenness of sight and, with perhaps just a touch of humour, was employed here as a perfect symbol for gemmologists and gemmology students. In its paws it holds one of the oldest heraldic emblems, an ‘escarbuncle’. This is a symbol of supremacy, but also represents a brilliant jewel with light radiating from it. Its tips are jewels of many different colours. Gem-A is often referred to as the central jewel, with gem education and knowledge radiating from it with the jewelled tips being the graduates and members of the association.

== Courses ==
Gem-A provides courses in gemmology and diamond as well as offering a wide range of short courses, lab classes and one-day workshops, catering for both beginners and experts in the field.

Gem-A certificated courses include : Foundation in Gemmology course (leading to Cert. GA status) Diploma in Gemmology course (leading to possible FGA membership ) Diamond Diploma (leading to possible DGA membership). Graduates of the Diploma in Gemmology are eligible for election to Fellowship of the Gemmological Association and may use the letters FGA after their name for as long as they remain paid-up members of the association. Graduates of the Diamond Diploma may use the letters DGA after their name for as long as they remain paid-up members of the association.

Certificated courses can be studied in-house at the Gem-A London headquarters through daytime or evening classes, at one of Gem-A's international Accredited Teaching Centres or by Open Distance Learning (ODL) online classes.

Gem-A holds an annual conference, bringing together international speakers and delegates to meet and discuss important changes within the gem industry. It publishes the Gems & Jewellery magazine seven times a year as well as NAG's The Jeweller.

== Charitable status ==
As an education Charity (UK Registered Charity No. 11099555) Gem-A has a responsibility to provide gem information and education to the widest possible audience. To this end Gem-A has worked with developing countries including Madagascar, Pakistan and Afghanistan, and it also plays an active part in promoting high ethical and environmental standards in the gem industry.

== Publications ==
Gems and Jewellery, a magazine published seven times a year, dealing with all aspects of gems and jewellery as well as NAG's the Jeweller.

The Journal of Gemmology, a quarterly academic peer-reviewed journal, published in collaboration with the Swiss Gemmological Institute SSEF and supported by the American Gemological Laboratories (AGL) and the Gem and Jewelry Institute of Thailand (GIT).”

== See also ==
- Gemological Institute of America
- Canadian Gemmological Association
