= Si3 =

Si3 may refer to:

- SI3, a diamond clarity guide
- Si3 (film) or Singam 3, a 2017 Indian Tamil language film by Hari, third part of the Singam film series
