= Canadian Gemmological Association =

Canadian association specialised in jewellery

The Canadian Gemmological Association (CGA) is a Canada-wide professional organization which sets standards in the practice of gemology. It is a non-profit, educational organization, which provides a forum for Canadian gemmologists to meet and share experiences and knowledge about gemstones. The CGA acts as a liaison with governments in setting guidelines for the sale and marketing of diamonds, coloured stones and pearls, and helps to establish guidelines for gem and jewellery appraising in Canada.

It was founded in 1958 by Dean S.M. Field, and has since provided training in gemmology to persons dealing with gemstones in the jewellery industry and to hobbyists for better appreciation and possible new career opportunities within gemmology.

The CGA is affiliated with the Gemmological Association of Great Britain.

== Courses ==
The CGA provides a two-year professional course in gemmology at its Toronto location, affiliated teaching centres at Vancouver Community College and the California Institute of Jewellery Training, and via correspondence.

== See also ==
- Gemology
- Canadian Institute of Gemmology
- Gemmological Association of Great Britain
- Gemological Institute of America
