= Diamond clarity =

Relating to the appearance of internal and surface defects in diamond

Diamond clarity is the quality of diamonds that relates to the existence and visual appearance of internal characteristics of a diamond called inclusions, and surface defects, called blemishes. Clarity is one of the four Cs of diamond grading, the others being carat, color, and cut.

Inclusions are solids, liquids, or gases that were trapped in a mineral as it formed. They may be crystals of a foreign material or even another diamond crystal, or may have produced structural imperfections, such as tiny cracks that make a diamond appear whitish or cloudy. The number, size, color, relative location, orientation, and visibility of inclusions can all affect the relative clarity of a diamond. A clarity grade is assigned based on the overall appearance of the stone under ten times magnification, which is the standard magnification for loupes used in the gem world.

Most inclusions present in gem-quality diamonds do not affect the diamonds' performance or structural integrity and are not visible to the naked eyes. However, large clouds can affect a diamond's ability to transmit and scatter light. Large cracks close to or breaking the surface may reduce a diamond's resistance to fracture.

Diamonds with higher clarity grades are more valued, with the exceedingly rare "Flawless" graded diamond fetching the highest price. Minor inclusions or blemishes are useful, as they can be used as unique identifying marks analogous to fingerprints. In addition, as synthetic diamond technology improves and distinguishing between natural and synthetic diamonds becomes more difficult, inclusions or blemishes can be used as proof of natural origin.

Heavily included diamonds used to be solely for industrial use. In recent years, salt and pepper diamonds have gained increasing popularity.

== Inclusions and blemishes ==
There are several types of inclusions and blemishes, which affect a diamond's clarity to varying degrees. Features resulting from diamond enhancement procedures, such as laser lines, are also considered inclusions or blemishes.

=== Inclusions ===
- Clouds
- Feathers
- Included crystals or minerals
- Knots
- Cavities
- Cleavage
- Bearding
- Internal graining
- Pinpoint
- Laser lines
- Twinning Wisp
- Grain center
- Laser drill hole
- Knot
- Needle

=== Blemishes ===
- Polish lines
- Grain boundaries
- Naturals
- Scratches
- Nicks
- Pits
- Chips
- Breaks
- Dark spots
- Light spots
- Abrasions

== Clarity grading ==
=== Gemological Institute of America grading system ===
==== History ====
In 1952, Richard T. Liddicoat, along with Marquis Person, Joe Phillips, Robert Crowningshield and Bert Krashes began to work on a new diamond grading system which they called the "diamond grading and evaluation appraisal". In 1953, they released their new system which assessed three aspects of diamonds; make, color and clarity. They took terminology used in the industry at the time and refined the definitions to produce a clarity scale by which diamonds could be consistently graded. The system at that time contained nine grades: Flawless, VVS_{1}, VVS_{2}, VS_{1}, VS_{2}, SI_{1}, SI_{2}, I_{1}, and I_{2}. The 'I' of the I_{1}, and I_{2} grades originally stood for "Imperfect".

During the 1970s, two changes were made to the system. Firstly, the Internally Flawless grade was added, as GIA noticed that many diamonds were being aggressively cut to remove any surface blemishes, and thereby reducing the cutting quality ("make") of the diamonds. The Internally Flawless grade gave diamond manufacturers a choice to leave blemishes on the surface of the stone, and achieve a grade higher than VVS_{1}. The second change made to the grading system was the introduction of the I_{3} grade. This change was made in response to a growing number of diamonds of very low clarity being cut.

The last change to the clarity grading system took place in the 1990s when the term "imperfect" was changed to "included".

==== Modern GIA grading system ====
GIA diamond clarity grading scale
Category	Flawless	Internally Flawless	Very Very Slightly Included		Very Slightly Included		Slightly Included		Included		
Grade	FL	IF	VVS_{1}	VVS_{2}	VS_{1}	VS_{2}	SI_{1}	SI_{2}	I_{1}	I_{2}	I_{3}

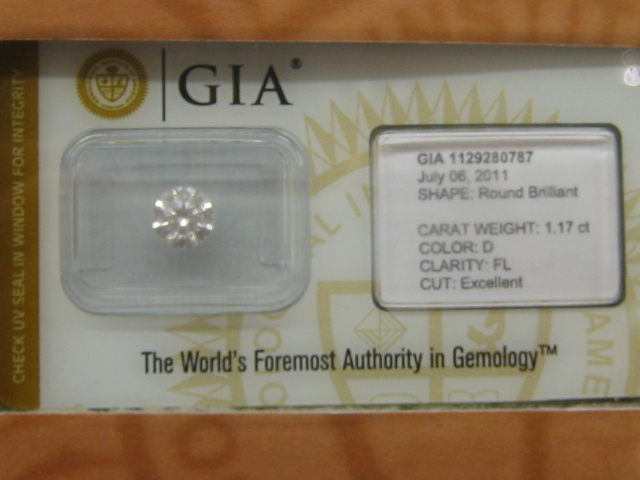
Diamond certified FL (flawless) by the GIA

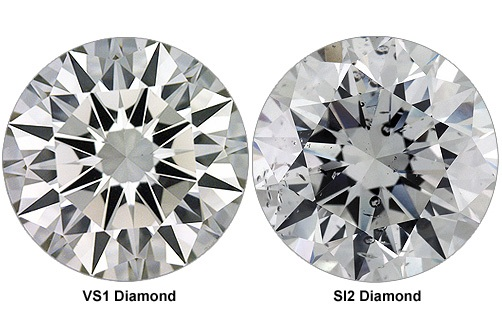
Two diamonds of grade VS_{1} and SI_{2} respectively.

The GIA diamond grading scale is divided into six categories and eleven grades. The clarity categories and grades are:

- Flawless category (FL) diamonds have no inclusions or blemishes visible under 10× magnification.
- Internally Flawless category (IF) diamonds have no inclusions visible under 10× magnification, only small blemishes on the diamond surface.
- Very, Very Slightly Included category (VVS) diamonds have minute inclusions that are difficult for a skilled grader to see under 10× magnification. The VVS category is divided into two grades; VVS1 denotes a higher clarity grade than VVS2. Pinpoints and needles set the grade at VVS.
- Very Slightly Included category (VS) diamonds have minor inclusions that are difficult to somewhat easy for a trained grader to see when viewed under 10× magnification. The VS category is divided into two grades; VS1 denotes a higher clarity grade than VS2. Typically the inclusions in VS diamonds are invisible without magnification; however, infrequently some VS2 inclusions may still be visible. An example would be on a large emerald cut diamond which has a small inclusion under the corner of the table.
- Slightly Included category (SI) diamonds have noticeable inclusions that are easy, or very easy for a trained grader to see when viewed under 10× magnification. The SI category is divided into two grades; SI1 denotes a higher clarity grade than SI2. These may or may not be noticeable to the naked eye.
- Included category (I) diamonds have obvious inclusions that are clearly visible to a trained grader under 10× magnification. Included diamonds have inclusions that are usually visible without magnification or have inclusions that threaten the durability of the stone. The I category is divided into three grades; I1 denotes a higher clarity grade than I2, which in turn is higher than I3. Inclusions in I1 diamonds often are seen by the unaided eye. I2 inclusions are easily seen, while I3 diamonds have large and extremely easy to see inclusions that typically impact the brilliance of the diamond, as well as having inclusions that are often likely to threaten the structure of the diamond.

===== GIA clarity grading procedure =====
GIA clarity grading is performed under 10× magnification with darkfield illumination. The GIA Laboratory uses as standard equipment binocular stereo microscopes which are able to zoom to higher magnifications. These microscopes are equipped with darkfield illumination, as well as an ultraviolet filtered overhead light. When grading is performed using a 10× handheld loupe, darkfield illumination is more difficult to achieve. The grader must use a light source in such a way that the base of the stone is lit from the side, and the crown of the stone is shielded from the light.

After thoroughly cleaning the diamond, the diamond is picked up using tweezers in a girdle-to-girdle hold. The grader views the diamond for the first time through the table, studying the culet area of the stone for inclusions. The diamond is then set down and picked up with the tweezers in a table-to-culet hold. In this position, the diamond can be studied from the pavilion side, and the crown side, examining the diamond through each facet for inclusions. Once a sector of the diamond has been thoroughly examined, the grader rotates the diamond in the tweezer, so that the neighboring sector can be examined. The grader uses darkfield lighting to reveal characteristics, and alternates to reflected, overhead lighting to ascertain whether a characteristic lies within the stone, on the stones surface, or both. If the grader is using a stereo microscope, they may zoom in to a higher magnification to make closer observations of an inclusion, but then return to 10× magnification to make an assessment of its impact on the clarity grade.

If a stereo binocular microscope has been used, a final assessment using a 10× loupe is performed before the final judgment is made on the clarity of the stone. The grader first decides the clarity category of the diamond: none (FL, or IF for a blemish), minute (VVS), minor (VS), noticeable (SI), or obvious (I). The decision is then made on the grade of the diamond.

=== Grading systems by other organizations ===
The clarity grading system developed by the GIA has been used throughout the industry as well as by other diamond grading agencies including the American Gemological Society (AGS), and the International Gemological Institute (IGI). There are other smaller labs which use the GIA system as well. These grading agencies base their clarity grades on the characteristics of inclusions visible to a trained professional when a diamond is viewed from above under 10× magnification.

==== World Jewellery Confederation ====
CIBJO diamond clarity grading scale
GIA	all stones	FL	IF	VVS_{1}	VVS_{2}	VS_{1}	VS_{2}	SI_{1}	SI_{2}	I_{1}	I_{2}	I_{3}
CIBJO	over 0.47ct	Loupe clean		VVS_{1}	VVS_{2}	VS_{1}	VS_{2}	SI_{1}	SI_{2}	P_{I}	P_{II}	P_{III}
CIBJO	under 0.47ct	Loupe clean		VVS		VS		SI		P_{I}	P_{II}	P_{III}

The World Jewellery Confederation developed the International Clarity Scale for grading diamonds. This clarity scale mirrors the GIA grading scale, except nomenclature varies. The system names these clarity grades; Loupe Clean, Very, very small inclusions (VVS1 and VVS2), Very small inclusions (VS1 and VS2), Small inclusions (SI1 and SI2), Piqué (P1, P2, and P3; from a French word meaning "blemished").

Clarity grading by WJC standards is by examination using a 10× achromatic, aplanatic loupe in normal light.

==== American Gem Society ====
AGS diamond clarity grading scale
GIA	FL	IF	VVS_{1}	VVS_{2}	VS_{1}	VS_{2}	SI_{1}	SI_{2}	I_{1}		I_{2}	I_{3}
AGS	0		1	2	3	4	5	6	7	8	9	10

The American Gem Society grades clarity on a number scale between 0 and 10. These numbers grades correlate almost exactly with the GIA system, but with some differences. The flawless and internally flawless (0) grades are grouped together with notation defining whether the stone is free from external blemishes, the VVS through SI grades are numbered 1 through 6, and then there are four grades 7 through 10 for the included category.

Clarity grading by AGS standards requires examination using a binocular stereo microscope equipped with adjustable zoom magnification and darkfield illumination.

==== International Diamond Council ====
IDC diamond clarity grading scale
GIA	FL	IF	VVS_{1}	VVS_{2}	VS_{1}	VS_{2}	SI_{1}	SI_{2}	I_{1}	I_{2}	I_{3}
IDC	Loupe clean	Loupe clean	VVS_{1}	VVS_{2}	VS_{1}	VS_{2}	SI_{1}	SI_{2}	P_{I}	P_{II}	P_{III}

The IDC or the International Diamond Council uses a very similar standard to CIBJO. IDC loupe clean stones that have external blemishes have notations made on the grading report. IDC clarity grading is by examination using a 10× achromatic, aplanatic loupe in normal light.

==== European Gemological Laboratory ====
EGL diamond clarity grading scales
GIA	FL	IF	VVS_{1}	VVS_{2}	VS_{1}	VS_{2}	SI_{1}		SI_{2}	I_{1}	I_{2}	I_{3}
EGL USA	IF		VVS_{1}	VVS_{2}	VS_{1}	VS_{2}	SI_{1}	SI_{2}	SI_{3}	I_{1}	I_{2}	I_{3}
EGL India	FL	IF	VVS_{1}	VVS_{2}	VS_{1}	VS_{2}	SI_{1}	SI_{2}	SI_{3}	P_{1}	P_{2}	P_{3}

The European Gemological Laboratory (EGL) introduced the SI3 as a clarity grade. While intended as a range to include borderline SI2 / I1 stones, it is now commonly used to mean I1's which are nearly "eye clean", that is, which have inclusions which are not obviously visible to the naked eye. Because GIA and EGL use the same nomenclature, but apply the standards differently, purchasers of diamonds can be easily confused or mislead.

== Clarity grading considerations ==
All grades reflect the appearance to an experienced grader when viewed from above at 10× magnification, though higher magnifications and viewing from other angles are used during the grading process. The grader studies the diamond for internal characteristics and judges them on the basis of five clarity factors: size, number, position, nature, and color or relief. The clarity grade is assessed on the basis of the most noticeable inclusions, the so-called "grade setting inclusions". Less significant inclusions are ignored for the purposes of setting the grade; however, they may still be plotted onto a diamond plot chart.

Accurate clarity grading as with other grading steps must be done with the diamond "loose", i.e. not set into any mounting. Inclusions are often difficult to see from the crown side of the diamond, and may be concealed by the setting.

=== Size ===
The first clarity factor which is assessed is a clarity characteristic's size. Larger characteristics are typically more noticeable under magnification, thereby placing the diamond into a lower clarity grade.

=== Number ===
The second clarity factor which is assessed is the number of clarity characteristics. Generally, the more characteristics, the lower the clarity grade. This assessment is made by judging how readily they can be seen, not by the actual number of characteristics.

=== Position ===
The third clarity factor which is assessed is the characteristic's position. When an inclusion is directly under the table of the diamond it is most visible. An inclusion under the table and positioned close to a pavilion facet will reflect multiple times around the stone, giving this type of inclusion the name "reflector". Reflectors are graded as if each reflection were an inclusion (although in plotting the diamond it is only plotted once). For this reason, reflectors have a greater impact on the clarity grade. Inclusions become less visible when they are positioned under the crown facets, or near the girdle of the stone. These inclusions may often be more easily seen from the pavilion side of the diamond than from crown side of the diamond.

Additionally, the position of large feathers, knots and included crystals positioned where they extend to the girdle or crown of the stone affect the clarity grade. Diamonds worn in jewelry typically will withstand breakage, however inclusions of this nature and in these positions can pose a risk for further extension of the break in the structure of the diamond. Inclusions that are judged to pose at least a moderate risk of breakage to the stone are graded in the Included category.

=== Nature ===
The fourth clarity factor which is assessed is a characteristic's nature. The characteristic's nature determines whether it is internal (extending into the stone) or external (limited to the surface of the stone). Internal characteristics automatically exclude the diamond from the Flawless, and Internally Flawless categories. External characteristics exclude the diamond from the Flawless category.

An internal characteristic of a diamond may be classified as a(n): bruise, cavity, chip, cleavage, cloud, crystal, feather, grain center, indented natural, internal graining, knot, laser drill hole, needle, pinpoint, or twinning wisp.

An external characteristic of a diamond may be classified as a(n): abrasion, natural, nick, pit, polish lines, polish mark, scratch, surface graining, or extra facet.

The nature will also determine whether an inclusion poses a risk to the stone. An inclusion that may cause a break in the crystal structure (included crystal, feather, knot, and cleavage) may, depending on its position, pose a moderate level of risk for further breakage.

=== Color or relief ===
The fifth clarity factor which is assessed is the color and relief of clarity characteristics. Characteristics that contrast with the surrounding diamond are said to have "relief". The degree to which this color and relief is noticeable affects the clarity grade of the diamond. Colored inclusions invariably show contrast and are more easily seen. An exception is a black pinpoint inclusion, which is often more difficult to see than a white pinpoint.

All these factors mentioned are considered together rather than independently, since the visibility and effect of an inclusion can depend on a combination of its size, number, position, nature and relief.

== Rarity and value ==
Diamonds become increasingly rare as clarity increases. Only about 20% of all diamonds mined have a clarity rating high enough for the diamond to be considered appropriate for use as a gemstone; the other 80% are relegated to industrial use. Of that top 20%, a significant portion contains an inclusion or inclusions that are visible to the naked eye upon close inspection. Those that do not have a visible inclusion when the gem is examined approximately 6 inches from the naked eye are known as "eye-clean", although visible inclusions can sometimes be hidden under the setting in a piece of jewelry. The most expensive gem diamonds fall within the VS and SI grades with FL, IF, and even VVS stones commanding significant premiums. FL and IF stones are sometimes referred to as "museum quality" or "investment grade" to denote their rarity although the term "investment grade" is misleading as diamonds have historically been illiquid and questionable stores of value.

== Clarity enhancement ==
Laser "drilling" involves using a laser to burn a hole to a colored inclusion, followed by acid washing to remove the coloring agent. The clarity grade is the grade after the treatment. The treatment is considered permanent.

Clarity can also be "enhanced" by filling the fracture much like a car windshield crack can be treated. Such diamonds are sometimes called "fracture filled diamonds". Reputable vendors must disclose this filling and reputable filling companies use filling agents which show a flash of color, commonly orange or pink, when viewed closely. There is a significant price discount for fracture-filled diamonds. The GIA will not grade fracture-filled diamonds, in part because the treatment is not as permanent as the diamond itself. Reputable companies often provide for repeat treatments if heat causes damage to the filling. The heat required to cause damage is that of a blowtorch used to work on settings, and it is essential to inform anyone working on a setting if the diamond is fracture-filled, so they can apply cooling agents to the diamond and use greater care while working on it.

GIA, as a matter of policy, does not grade clarity-enhanced diamonds but it will grade laser-drilled diamonds since it considers the enhancement to be permanent in nature. If a GIA report has the words "clarity enhanced" or "fracture filled", it is surely a counterfeit report.

== See also ==
- Diamond
- Diamond color
- Diamond cut
- Diamond enhancement
- Gemology
- List of diamonds
- Synthetic diamond
