= Josh Barrett =

Josh Barrett may refer to:

- Josh Barrett (footballer) (born 1998), Irish footballer
- Josh Barrett (Home and Away), a fictional character from the Australian soap opera Home and Away
- Josh Barrett (American football) (born 1984), American football safety
- Josh Barrett (Lead Singer of The Wailers 2014-2018)
