= Vincent Manson =

South African gemologist (1936–1999)

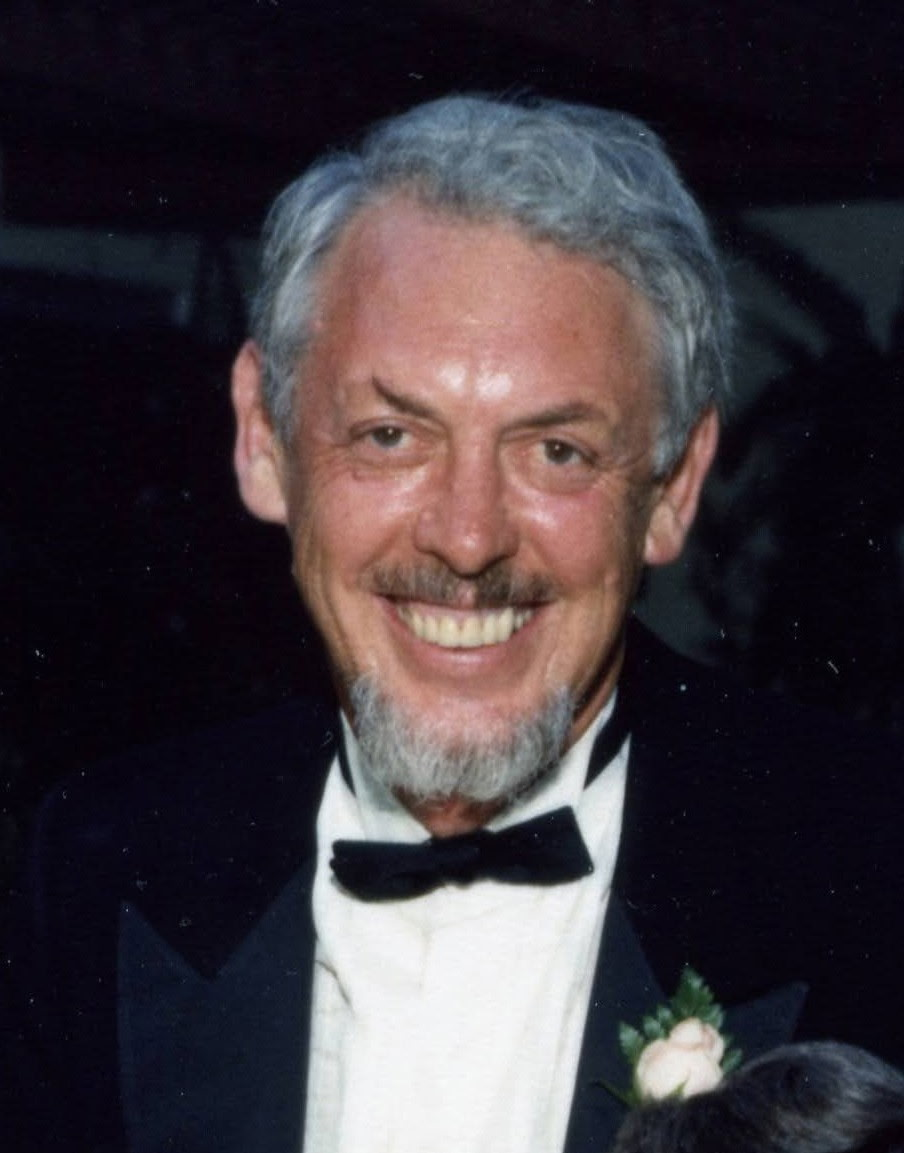
- Manson in 1990
- Born: Douglas Martin Vincent Manson; 1936; South Africa
- Died: July 3, 1999; Carlsbad, California
- Education: University of Witwatersrand; Columbia University
- Spouse: Averil McDonnell
- Awards: Richard T. Liddicoat Lifetime Achievement Award (1999)
- Scientific career
- Fields: Gemology; mineralogy; geology
- Workplaces: American Museum of Natural History; Gemological Institute of America

Douglas Martin Vincent Manson (1936 – July 3, 1999) was a South African geologist and gemologist who is known for the exhibits he created while curator for the American Museum of Natural History and for his scientific contributions to the field of gemology.

== Career ==
Manson graduated from the University of Witwatersrand with both a Bachelor of Science and a Master's degree in geology. He was employed at De Beers' Diamond Research Laboratory for two years, before moving to Nova Scotia where he worked in geochemical prospecting. He continued his studies in geology and earned a Ph.D. from Columbia University in 1964. At Columbia, Manson worked as an assistant to Arie Poldervaart until the latter's death.

Manson was brought on as Assistant Curator of Mineralogy at the American Museum of Natural History following the departure of Brian Mason in 1965. His work in the reformed Department of Mineral Sciences culminated with the opening of the Harry Frank Guggenheim Hall of Minerals, Morgan Memorial Hall of Gems, and Arthur Ross Hall of Meteorites in 1976. During his tenure, Manson implemented the use of computers to perform analysis of geological data.

Manson was hired by the Gemological Institute of America (GIA) in 1976. He established the Research Department, and was later named Director of Forward Planning. He became the associate editor of Gems & Gemology, a journal in which he frequently published articles on the classification of garnets.

Manson worked to establish the International Gemological Symposium, a yearly event which he chaired three times. He remained with the GIA until his death in 1999.

== Personal life and legacy ==
In 1963, Manson married Averil McDonnell (d. 2004), a fellow South African. They lived in New Jersey before relocating to California in 1976. They had two sons. Manson died while residing in Carlsbad, California on July 3, 1999 after battling with cancer. After his death, he was awarded the Richard T. Liddicoat Lifetime Achievement Award in 1999.

The D. Vincent Manson Fund for Gemological Research was established by the Gemological Institute of America in his honor.
