= Swiss Gemmological Institute =

Gemmology laboratory located in Basel, Switzerland

The Swiss Gemmological Institute (SSEF) is a gemmology laboratory located in Basel, Switzerland. It is a part of the Schweizerische Stiftung für Edelstein Forschung (SSEF, Swiss Foundation for Gemstone Research).

== History ==
The Swiss Gemmological Institute was founded on an independent basis by trade organisations on August 22, 1972. George Bosshart, mineralogist and GG, was the first director after the laboratory's opening in Zürich. Diamond grading was the major task and colour stones were tested rather exceptionally. In 1980, Bosshart hired Dr. Henry A. Hänni, Mineralogist and FGA. In 1994, Hänni moved the laboratory to Basel where he had been teaching gemmology at Basel university. Prof. H.A. Hänni retired in 2009 and Dr. Michael Krzemnicki, who had been working for SSEF since 1999, took over his position as a director.

In 1994, the Swiss Gemmological Institute was the first gemmological laboratory to offer testing for possible Beryllium diffusion in corundum. Early on, the institute took exclusive custody of the CIBJO Diamond C1 master set.

At the turn of the 21st century, unbeaded pearls invaded the market, thus greatly impacting demand for pearl analysis by the institute. In 2013, SSEF achieved a breakthrough in successfully extracting DNA from pearls and thereby enabling DNA fingerprinting of pearls. In 2014, SSEF unveiled the ASDI instrument (Automated Spectral Diamond Inspection), the first industrial scale automated solution for keeping synthetic diamond melee out of the supply chain. IN 2015, the institute opened a new lab in Basel with twice the production capacity of its actual lab. In 2017, SSEF became the first gem lab in the world to introduce radiocarbon age dating of pearls as a service to clients. In 2020, SSEF and University of Zürich researchers unveiled a new methodology (published in the journal Scientific Reports) to extract DNA from precious coral samples and thereby identify the species of samples.

== Activity ==
SSEF has since long been offering its independent services to the global gemstone and jewellery trade. The mandate of the SSEF is to analyse precious stones and jewellery; issuing test reports for coloured gemstones, diamonds and pearls. Its forte lies in the detection of gemstone authenticity, origin, and gem treatments on a scientific and reproducible basis. It offers expert independent advice to a wide gemmological clientele including gem dealers, jewellers, auction houses and private customers in many countries. Gemmological training courses from basic to highly specialised are a further contribution to an international scholarship, ensuring a high level of gemmological knowledge and skills in the trade.

The institute, based in Basel since 1994, is directed by Dr. Michael S. Krzemnicki, who also lectures at the University of Basel. The laboratory was recognised by the International Confederation of Jewellers and Goldsmiths (CIBJO) in 1978 and is also a member of the International Colored Stone Association (ICA) and the Laboratory Manual Harmonisation Committee (LMHC). The SSEF introduced a full gem treatment disclosure policy in 1998, published in a book called "SSEF Standards & Applications for Diamond Reports, Gemstone Reports and Test Reports".

Moreover, SSEF places a strong focus on education and pursuing gemmological research. It offers basic and advanced gemmological training courses, scientific gemmology workshops and expert lectures covering a wide array of gemmological subjects. It a pioneer in gemmological research, collaborating with leading Swiss universities and other worldwide gemmological laboratories.
