= Dirk Borgognone =

American football player (born 1968)

No. 9
- Position: Placekicker

Personal information
- Born: January 9, 1968 (age 58); Elko, Nevada, U.S.
- Listed height: 6 ft 2 in (1.88 m)
- Listed weight: 221 lb (100 kg)

Career information
- High school: Reno (NV)
- College: Tennessee; University of the Pacific
- NFL draft: 1990: undrafted

Career history
- Minnesota Vikings (1990)*; Atlanta Falcons (1991)*; Cleveland Browns (1992)*; Indianapolis Colts (1993)*; Miami Dolphins (1994)*; Green Bay Packers (1995)
- * Offseason or practice squad member only
- Stats at Pro Football Reference

Dirk Borgognone (born January 9, 1968) is a former National Football League placekicker who holds the record for the longest field goal ever kicked in the history of high school football at 68 yards.

== Early life ==
Borgognone attended Reno High School, initially playing as a soccer player. He soon switched to football. On Friday, September 27, 1985, he kicked the longest field goal in high school football history with the soccer-style kicking form, during a game at Sparks High School. The kick measured 68 yards and was longer than any that had ever been successfully kicked in the NFL up to that point, or the NCAA.

== College career ==
After high school, Borgognone attended the University of Tennessee for a year before he returned to Reno, and Truckee Meadows Community College eventually transferring to the University of the Pacific. Borgognone's college career, however, was derailed by a 1988 change to the NCAA rule books that banned kicking off tees for field goal attempts. This not only reduced the general range for field goals (the record off a tee was 67 yards, without, only 65), but Borgognone had always kicked off a tee and was unprepared for the rule change. Borgognone left college early, to pursue an NFL career as a kickoff specialist.

== Professional career ==
Much like Ove Johansson, whose 69-yard field goal in the NAIA in 1976 had been the only field goal on record to have bested Borgognone's high school kick (though that figure was later bested by a 70-yard field goal by Cam Little in the NFL preseason in 2025), Borgognone struggled to make the National Football League. He spent years bouncing between NFL training camps, mainly as a kickoff specialist (the NFL had prohibited the use of kicking tees for field goals and extra points for a decade). Dirk received unsuccessful tryouts from the Minnesota Vikings in 1990, the Atlanta Falcons in 1991, the Cleveland Browns in 1992, and the Indianapolis Colts in 1993. Both the Miami Dolphins and Washington Redskins gave him a tryout during the 1994 NFL season, but neither team signed him. He was picked up by the Green Bay Packers for the 1995 season and was on the roster for two games, filling in for their usual starter Chris Jacke. He made eight kickoffs but did not attempt a field goal or extra point. Borgognone, after a poor tryout for the San Francisco 49ers in 1996, never played professional football again. He briefly considered a football comeback in 1999 at the request of Ray Pelfrey, but, despite feeling physically able to do so, decided against making another run at the NFL.

== Personal life ==
Dirk Borgognone lives in Reno, Nevada, and is a widower; his wife, Nevada Highway Patrol officer Kara Kelly-Borgognone, was killed while on duty for the NHP in a car accident on February 25, 2008. Kelly-Borgognone was driving to a location where a bomb was reported—a report that was later determined to be false. Borgognone has two children.
