= Sundowner (hotel and casino) =

Former hotel and casino in Reno, Nevada

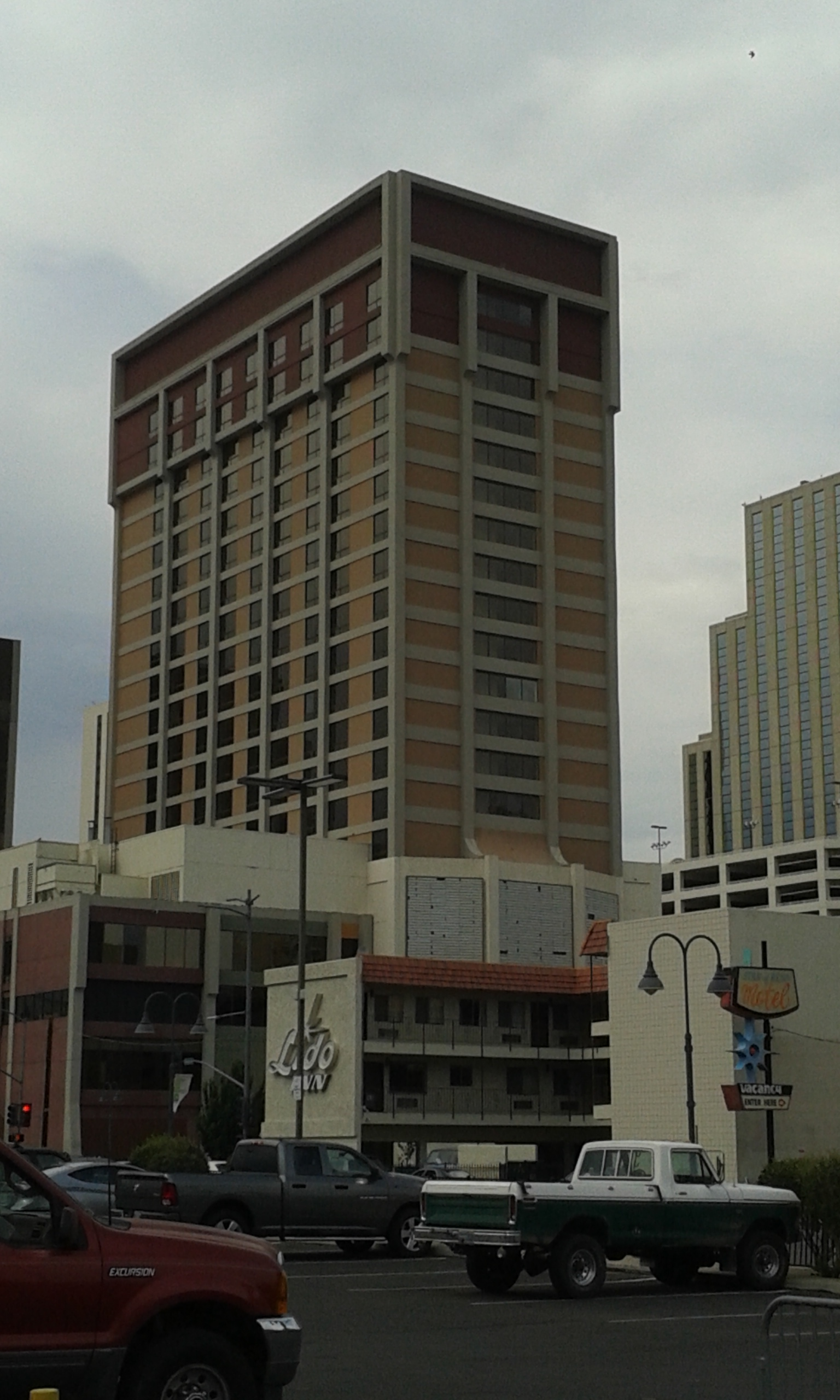
- Unfinished 19-story tower in 2017
- Interactive map of the Sundowner area
- Alternative names: The Belvedere (since 2007)

General information
- Type: Condominiums; former hotel and casino
- Location: 450 North Arlington Avenue, Reno, Nevada, United States
- Coordinates: 39.529901°N 119.817966°W
- Completed: 1975 (11-story hotel building); 1979 (19-story hotel building)
- Opened: 1975 (Sundowner); 2007 (Belvedere)
- Renovated: 2004–07
- Owner: Pine Cone Circle Investment (19-story tower)

Technical details
- Floor count: 13 (Belvedere); 19 (unfinished tower)
- Floor area: 25,000 sq ft (2,300 m^{2}) (Sundowner casino)

Design and construction
- Architect: William F. Morris (Sundowner)
- Developer: Lake Tahoe Inn H.K.M. (Sundowner); Belvedere LLC and Menlo Oaks Corporation (Belvedere)
- Engineer: Culp and Tanner (Sundowner)
- Main contractor: Cal Neva Development (Sundowner; 1975); Metcalf Builders (Belvedere)

Other information
- Number of units: 583 rooms (Sundowner); 177 condo units (13-story building)

The Sundowner is a former hotel and casino located in downtown Reno, Nevada. The Sundowner's 11-story hotel opened in May 1975, and the casino opened two months later. With 349 rooms, it was the largest hotel in Reno until the opening of the MGM Grand in 1978. A 19-story hotel tower was added in 1979, bringing the total number of rooms to 583.

Profits fell after the opening of the nearby Silver Legacy resort in 1995. Because of poor revenue, the Sundowner closed in November 2003. It was sold the following year, and work began to convert the hotel rooms into condominium units, with the original hotel building reopening in 2007, as The Belvedere. Work on the 19-story tower was halted following financial problems, and the building remains unfinished.

== History ==
=== Sundowner ===
The property was previously occupied by the Central Junior High School, which operated until 1966 and was demolished two years later. In 1973, plans were announced for a hotel project to be built on the land, with construction expected to begin at the end of the year. Completion was originally scheduled for mid-1974.

The Sundowner hotel-casino was owned by George R. Karadanis, Robert M. Maloff, and Max Hoseit. Karadanis and Maloff had been business partners since 1959. The project was developed by Lake Tahoe Inn H.K.M., and was built by Cal Neva Development. William F. Morris was the architect, while the Los Angeles-based Culp and Tanner served as engineers. Prudential Insurance provided financing for the project. The 11-story hotel entered its final phase of construction in February 1975. Prudential was surprised upon discovering that the Sundowner was completed with casino space. The company did not intend to finance a gaming enterprise, and the developers initially said they had no intention of adding a casino to the project when they applied for the loan. Prudential's San Francisco office, which provided the loan, believed that the casino was merely a later addition with no intention of deceit.

The hotel portion opened on May 23, 1975, while the casino, restaurant and bar areas were scheduled to open by July 1. The hotel was originally part of the Quality Inn chain, and it was the brand's second-largest hotel. The Sundowner was also the largest hotel in the city, with 349 rooms, surpassing Harrah's Reno. The Sundowner remained as Reno's largest hotel for the next three years, until the opening of the MGM Grand. The Sundowner would employ approximately 350 people upon its full opening. The property included meeting space for up to 260 people.

In June 1975, the owners were denied a gaming license after the Nevada Gaming Control Board found Hoseit to be an unsuitable applicant. Hoseit, a California lawyer, had been named in several civil suits, accusing him of fraud, owing money, and causing pollution to water in Lake Tahoe. In July 1975, Karadanis and Maloff were approved as 50-50 gaming operators for the Sundowner, on the condition that Hoseit have no involvement with casino, food or beverage operations at the property. Hoseit remained an owner of the Sundowner. The casino opened later that month, with 200 slot machines.

A year later, plans were announced for an eventual expansion that would include 10,000 sq ft (930 m^{2}) of gaming space and a 150-room tower, both to be built on land that was then occupied by the Stardust Motel. At the time, an expansion of the Reno-Sparks sewer plant was planned to take effect in 1979. In the meantime, the Reno City Council requested that citizens conserve water. In response, Karadanis announced that water-saving measures had been implemented at the Sundowner. He hoped to begin construction on the expansion by the end of 1976, although the project was contingent on whether the city would continue to issue building permits prior to the sewer plant expansion.

Demolition of the Stardust Motel concluded in 1977, and construction began on a new building for additional casino, convention, and restaurant space. At the end of the year, the Reno City Council approved plans for a 19-story tower to be built at the base of the new casino building. Until the completion of the new sewer facility, large projects such as the Sundowner tower were restricted to using 10,000 gallons of sewer capacity per day. Buildings requiring more than that had to undergo a special review by the Reno City Council. Like the original building, the expansion was also designed by Morris.

The 19-story tower was approved with casino space on the first four floors, hotel rooms on floors 5 through 10, and office space on the remaining floors. At the end of 1978, during construction of the tower, Karadanis had plumbing installed on the office floors, which he now intended to finish as part of the hotel. The city ordered construction to stop, as Karadanis did not have approval for the additional hotel rooms, and the added plumbing was a violation of the city's sewer allocation procedures. Work resumed in January 1979, after Karadanis had the plumbing removed. Karadanis said, "At the time I didn't think putting the plumbing in was such a serious offense." Morris said that converting the "meager" office space into hotel rooms made more economic sense, as large office complexes were scheduled to open elsewhere in the city over the next few years. Two months after work resumed, the Sundowner became the focus of a federal grand jury investigation into sewer allocation procedures being taken by the city. The grand jury probe requested various documents and building plans related to the ongoing construction of the new tower.

In April 1979, the Reno City Council denied Karadanis' request to add additional hotel space in the tower. It was the latest rejection from the council regarding the matter. Councilmember Bill Wallace, referring to the unauthorized installation of plumbing, said, "I understand the need for more hotel rooms. But my concern is that we have said no to Mr. Karadanis before and yet he goes ahead and tries to make hotel rooms anyway. We said no and you, in effect, said we don't care. Your organization is thumbing its nose at the council." The council's denial contradicted an earlier recommendation of approval by the Regional Planning Commission. Karadanis re-submitted the proposal to the city two months later. The proposed hotel addition was looked over by the city's Major Projects Review Committee, which recommended the addition of 130 parking spaces. A staff analysis was conducted by the Regional Planning Commission and found that the additional hotel rooms would make the Sundowner too crowded, leading the planning staff to recommend denial of the project.

The tower neared completion at the end of 1979, when the city approved the conversion of the office space into 162 hotel rooms. However, the tower would not be allowed to open until 1981, when sewer capacity would become available. The tower would require 15,390 gallons per day in sewage treatment. A buffet, as well as G.K.'s Steakhouse, were added in 1980. Also added in the expansion were larger banquet facilities. The new tower brought the total number of rooms to 583. The casino measured 25,000 sq ft (2,300 m^{2}), and took up the first two floors. It included keno, table games, and a sportsbook.

In 1982, a former construction worker won a $4.4 million lawsuit against Karadanis and Maloff after being paralyzed in an accident during construction of the tower four years earlier.

A female impersonator show, Burlesque, ran at the Sundowner in the mid-1980s and was considered a success.

In 1986, the Sundowner and Karadanis had to pay $1.2 million in punitive damages after being found liable for a theft that occurred in one of the hotel rooms two years earlier, the result of inadequate security.

In 1987, hundreds of guests and employees were evacuated when an electrical fire broke out. The fire was contained after an hour, and was confined to concrete electrical transformer rooms, located beneath the hotel buildings. Smoke filled the casino and hotel, but there were no injuries. The Sundowner was closed for a few days to allow for an investigation of the fire. Electricity was out at the Sundowner during the fire, as the emergency generator had to be shut off due to the electrical system receiving fire damage. The Sundowner did not have battery-operated stairwell lights, prompting fire officials to recommend the installation of such lights in all Reno buildings over five stories in height.

In 1990, an electrical fire broke out on the sixth floor of the 11-story hotel tower, destroying one room and forcing the evacuation of 40 other rooms. An electrical short circuit was the cause of the fire, igniting a mattress. A brief fire occurred in 1993, when flames ignited another mattress and forced an evacuation.

The Sundowner was among filming locations for the 1996 film Hard Eight.

Beginning in 1999, the Sundowner underwent $1 million in property upgrades, while an additional $1 million was spent on new casino games. In 2001, Karadanis said that the Sundowner had failed to make a profit ever since the Silver Legacy resort opened across the street in 1995. The Sundowner was among other small properties that struggled to compete with the 1,700-room Silver Legacy. Karadanis and Maloff – who were 70 and 80 years old respectively – expressed a great interest in selling the Sundowner if the right buyer were to come along. Approximately half of the Sundowner's clientele consisted of tourists who arrived through charter buses, although business suffered further when bus companies began diverting their customers to tribal casinos in California.

On October 2, 2003, Karadanis announced that the Sundowner would close on December 1 due to economic losses, caused by competition with the Silver Legacy, as well as mega-resorts in Las Vegas and the tribal casinos in California. However, because of the financial problems, the Sundowner was unable to continue operations any longer and ultimately closed three weeks early, on the morning of November 10, 2003. Employees were given three days' notice, and did not receive a severance package. The closure affected 375 employees, and some of them subsequently pushed for changes to federal laws to give workers more financial protection whenever a business closes. A lawsuit was also filed by some of the workers.

=== Redevelopment ===
Siavash Barmand, a California developer, expressed an interest in purchasing the Sundowner and redeveloping it as a condominium facility with first-time buyers in mind. His company, Barmand & Associates, had previously redeveloped other buildings throughout California. Sale discussions with Karadanis and Maloff were underway in April 2004. Barmand intended to reopen the Sundowner as Belvedere Towers, with 377 condominium units. The project was named after Barmand's place of residence in Belvedere, California. The Reno Planning Commission approved Barmand's plans in June 2004, and he hoped to have the first residents move in within six to nine months. The Belvedere would offer affordable units in contrast to the new Riverwalk condominiums in Reno. Barmand was also in discussions with restaurant owners and grocery operators for new business space on the ground floor. He expected to take full control of the property in July 2004.

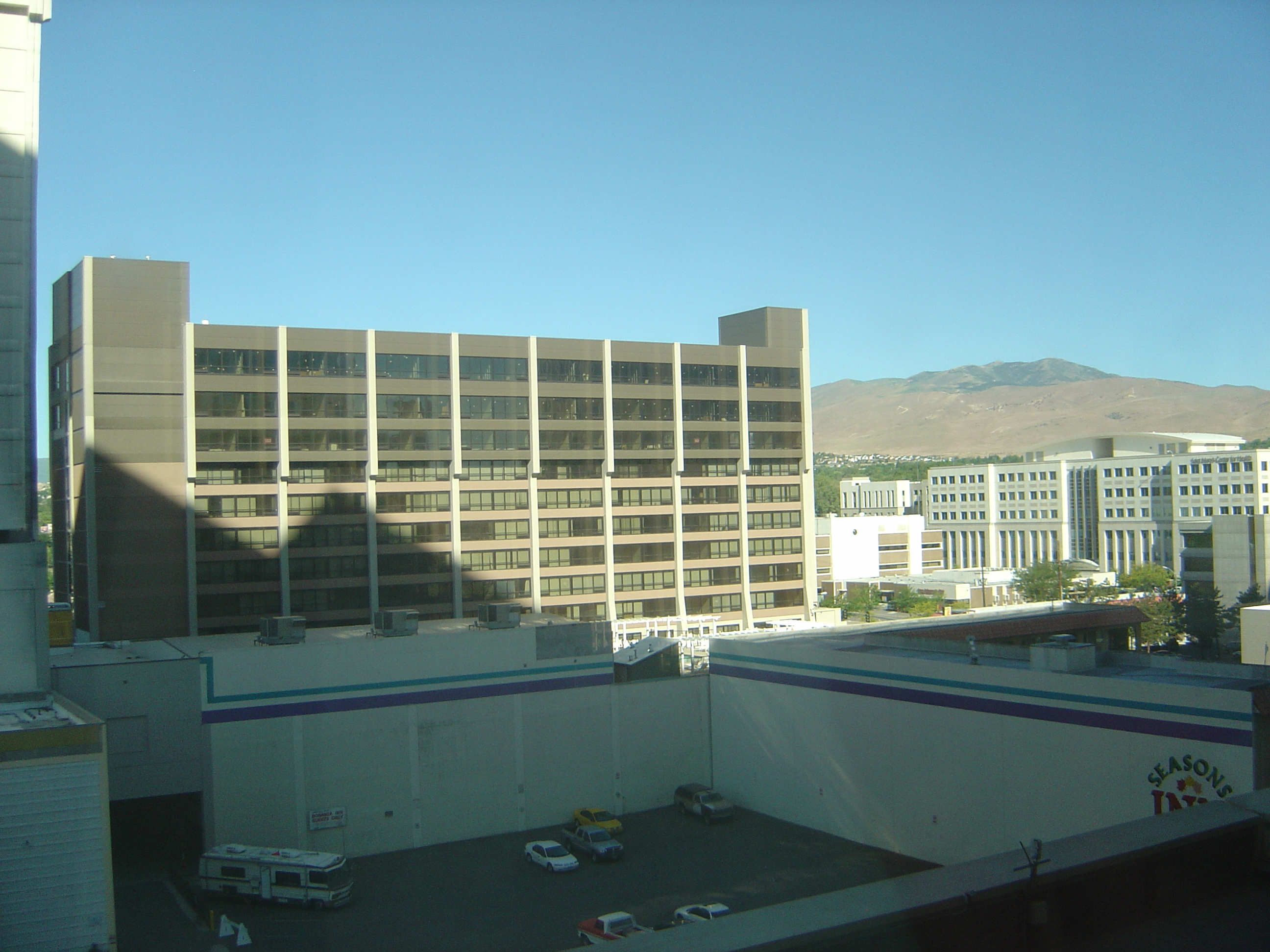
13-story Belvedere building in 2010

Although completion was set for January 2005, the date was pushed back as the development team found little to salvage inside the buildings. Bijan Madjlessi, a partner in the project, said that this led to design changes, with much of the interior being demolished, including walls. The Belvedere was developed by Menlo Oaks Corporation, a company led by Madjlessi. Belvedere LLC, a company owned by him, took over ownership of the property in 2006. Metcalf Builders of Carson City handled the renovation work. The initial work was focused on the 11-story north tower, which had been expected for completion in late 2005. However, interior construction was still heavily underway in mid-2006, with the first condo sales expected to be finalized in early 2007. Belvedere Towers had 70 units under contract to be sold to buyers. In 2006, during the ongoing condo conversion, a group of trade union construction workers protested against the project, stating that non-union workers were not receiving standard wages and health care benefits.

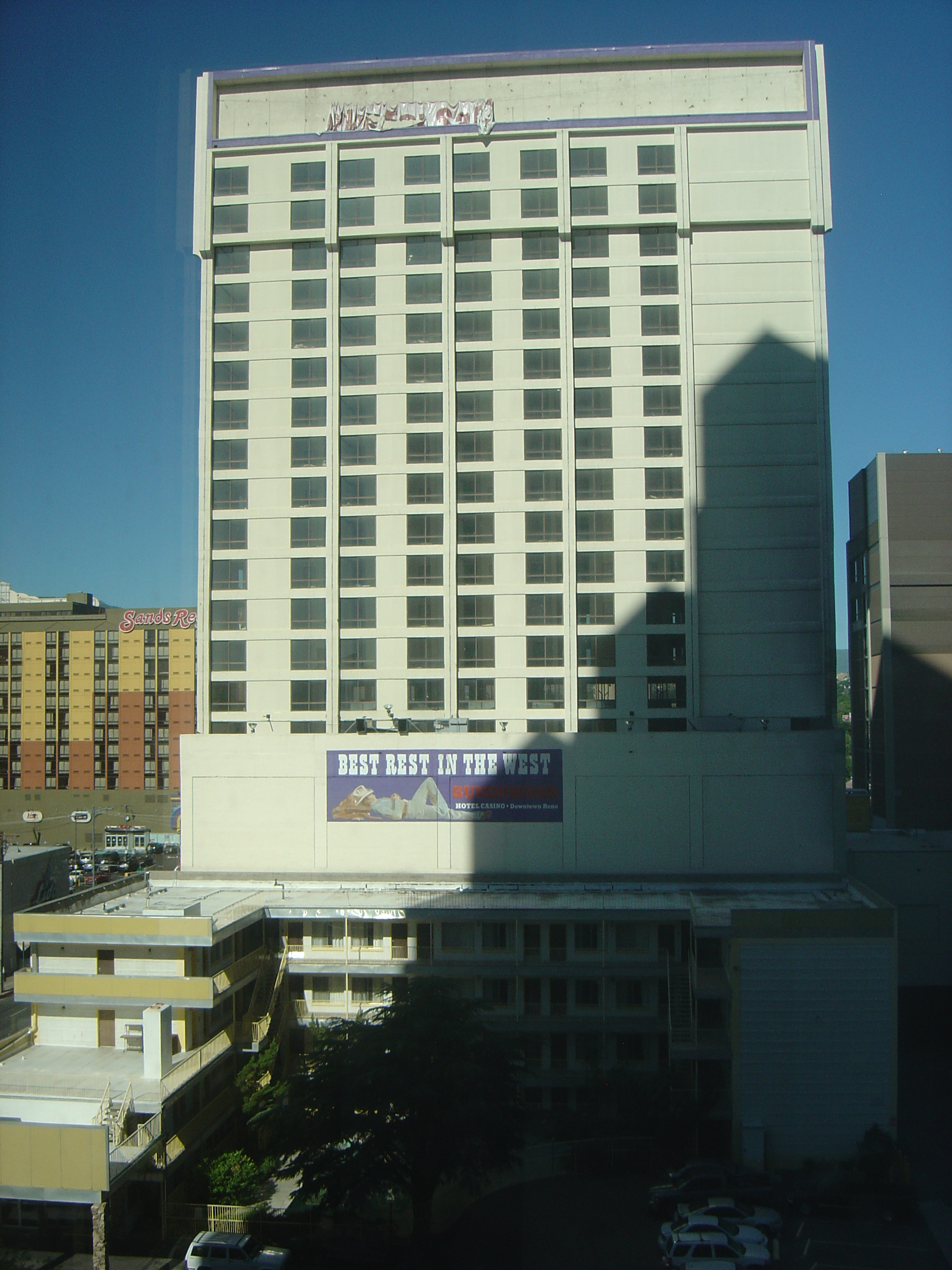
The former Sundowner tower in 2010

The north tower was increased to 13 floors, and was completed with 177 units, marketed as student housing. As of 2008, the north tower was occupied by a dozen residents. Later that year, a fire occurred at the south tower, which was still undergoing construction as a condominium building. The south tower was not occupied, except for an office. The fire was confined to the building's north side exterior, and prompted an evacuation of residents in the north tower. Aside from fire damage to the exterior, the building also received smoke and water damage inside, where a sprinkler head activated in response. The fire caused $120,000 in damage, and was declared an arson.

By the end of 2008, the Belvedere had been put up for sale, at a time when many local condo projects were suffering the effects of the Great Recession. More than 200 liens had been filed against the property, as well as two foreclosure default notices. Only 157 rooms in the south tower had been converted to condos before work stopped on the project. Completion of the tower had previously been expected in 2009. By 2010, the city had fined the project numerous times over code violations. Later in the year, clean-up began on the site, which included repairing and repainting the burned portion of the tower and removing a giant "condominiums for sale" sign.

In March 2011, Madjlessi settled a lawsuit filed by Metcalf Builders over unpaid work for the project. By that time, the project had accumulated $783,000 in unpaid property taxes for the past four years, owed by developer Belvedere LLC. In April 2011, Washoe County auctioned 92 unsold units in the north tower, in order to receive the money that was owed in unpaid taxes. The units were sold for $2 million to David Lonich, an attorney from Santa Rosa, California who had previously represented Madjlessi. The individual units ranged in sale price from $12,000 to $45,000. Another 80 units in the north tower were already owned by other people and were not included in the auction. Madjlessi had already sold the south tower to Mountain Air Enterprises, a company owned by investor Steven Scarpa, who was a fellow resident of Marin County, California. Madjlessi retained control of the casino building located at the base of the tower. A month after the sale, Madjlessi was charged with felony insurance fraud, after filing duplicate claims with two insurance companies following the 2008 fire.

Madjlessi died in an auto accident in 2014, and the Belvedere was appointed a receiver. The unfinished south tower was put up for sale for $12 million in 2016. Scarpa sold the south tower in November 2017, to Pine Cone Circle Investment, an affiliate of the Lake Tahoe company Prim Ventures. Because of the legal issues associated with the property, the sale took eight months to finalize. Prim looked at other properties – such as 3rd Street Flats in Reno – for ideas regarding the unfinished Sundowner tower, which contained nearly 200,000 sq ft (19,000 m^{2}) of space. Prim had no schedule for its plans, but intended to redevelop the tower as a mixed-use project that would include residential units, most likely apartments. For the lower floors, potential ideas included restaurants, retail, and a grocery store. The project would align with revitalization efforts focused on downtown Reno that were intended to attract more people to the area, including younger people.

In early 2022, the Reno Housing Authority (RHA) expressed interest in purchasing the unfinished tower and opening it as affordable housing. The RHA sought funds to purchase the tower for $18 million, while renovations would cost another $50 million. The refurbished tower would include 180 to 200 units, and the lower floors would be converted into RHA offices. However, the RHA dropped its purchase offer later in 2022, citing a lack of response from the building's owner.
