= Laboratoire français de gemmologie =

Coordinates: 48.8752°N 2.3380°E

The Laboratoire français de gemmologie (Gemological Laboratory of France) is the oldest gemological laboratory in the world, having been founded in 1929 by a customs official. It was run by the Paris Chamber of Commerce from 1933 to 2011, when it was attached to the Union Française de la Bijouterie, Joaillerie, Orfèvrerie, des Pierres et des Perles (BJOP). It operates completely independently as a source of expertise in gemology for clients' information and security, and has a partnership with the University of Nantes. Its director since 2011 has been Olivier Segura.
