= Dichroscope =

Pocket instrument

A dichroscope is a pocket instrument used in the field of gemology, and can be used to test transparent gemstones (crystals). Experienced gemologists, observing the pleochroism of some gems, can successfully detect gemstones from other artificial stones using this instrument.

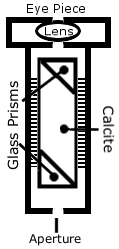
Calcite dichroscope

There are two types of dichroscopes available: calcite and polarizing. Of the two, calcite gives better results and is widely used by experienced gemologists. With the polarizing type, only one pleochroic color can be seen at a time. This makes the process time-consuming and difficult, though it is the most economical way to get results.

The dichroscope has been used since at least the start of the nineteenth century.

== Calcite dichroscope ==
A calcite dichroscope shows a gem's pleochroic colors in contrast with one another, allowing the viewer to easily determine whether the stone is singly or doubly refractive (uniaxial or biaxial, respectively). Singly refractive stones do not split light that enters them, leaving light as a single beam as it exits the stone. The result is that polarised light is unaffected by them (apart from ordinary refraction). On the contrary, doubly refractive stones split an entering light beam into two rays (an ordinary ray and an extraordinary ray) that are differently polarised depending on the angle, a property known as birefringence. Calcite dichroscopes are effective because the inner calcite component is able to split the entering light beam coming through the stone, revealing whether the stone is isotropic, uniaxial or biaxial.
