= Pleochroism =

Optical phenomenon

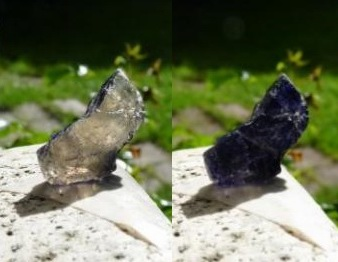
Pleochroism of cordierite shown by rotating a polarizing filter on the lens of the camera

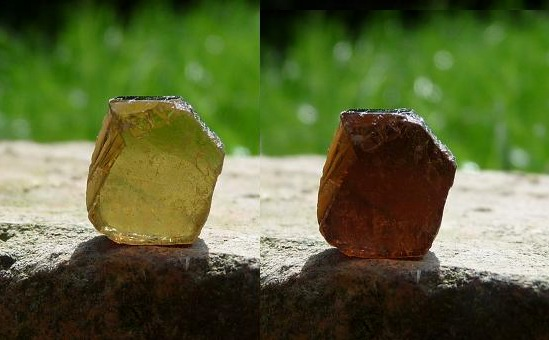
Pleochroism of tourmaline shown by rotating a polarizing filter on the lens of the camera

Pleochroism is an optical phenomenon in which a substance has different colors when positioned at different angles with respect to linearly polarized light.

== Etymology ==
The roots of the word are from Greek (from Ancient Greek πλέων (pléōn) 'more' and χρῶμα (khrôma) 'color'). It was first made compound in the German term Pleochroismus by the Austrian mineralogist Wilhelm Haidinger in 1854, in the journal Annalen der Physik und Chemie. Its first known English usage is by geologist James Dana in 1854.

== Background ==
Anisotropic crystals are crystals that have one or more optical axes, which optical properties can vary depending on the vibration direction of light. The vibration direction of the electric field of a light wave determines its polarization direction, and anisotropic crystals will respond in different ways if the angle between the polarization direction and an optical axis is changed. If the wavelengths at which light is absorbed varies with the angle between the polarization direction and the optical axis of a crystal, the light passing through the crystal will have different colors at different angles. This effect is called pleochroism.

Tetragonal, trigonal, and hexagonal minerals can only show two colors and are called dichroic. Orthorhombic, monoclinic, and triclinic crystals can show three and are trichroic. For example, hypersthene, which has two optical axes, can have a red, yellow, or blue appearance when oriented in three different ways in three-dimensional space. Isometric minerals cannot exhibit pleochroism. Tourmaline is notable for exhibiting strong pleochroism. Gems are sometimes cut and set either to display pleochroism or to hide it, depending on the colors and their attractiveness.

The pleochroic colors are at their maximum when light is polarized parallel with a principal optical vector. The axes are designated X, Y, and Z for direction, and alpha, beta, and gamma in magnitude of the refractive index. These axes can be determined from the appearance of a crystal in a conoscopic interference pattern. Where there are two optical axes, the acute bisectrix of the axes gives Z for positive minerals and X for negative minerals and the obtuse bisectrix gives the alternative axis (X or Z). Perpendicular to these is the Y axis. The color is measured with the polarization parallel to each direction. An absorption formula records the amount of absorption parallel to each axis in the form of X < Y < Z with the left most having the least absorption and the rightmost the most.

== In mineralogy and gemology ==
Pleochroism is an extremely useful tool in mineralogy and gemology for mineral and gem identification, since the different colors visible when rotating a gemstone or mineral in linearly polarized light can identify the possible crystalline structure of a gemstone or mineral and therefore help to classify it. Minerals that are otherwise very similar often have very different pleochroic color schemes. In such cases, a thin section of the mineral is used and examined under polarized transmitted light with a petrographic microscope. Another device using this property to identify minerals is the dichroscope.

== List of pleochroic minerals ==
=== Purple and violet ===
- Amethyst (very low): different shades of purple
- Andalusite (strong): green-brown / dark red / purple
- Beryl (medium): purple / colorless
- Corundum (high): purple / orange
- Hypersthene (strong): purple / orange
- Spodumene (Kunzite) (strong): purple / clear / pink
- Tourmaline (strong): pale purple / purple
- Putnisite: pale purple / bluish grey

=== Blue ===
- Aquamarine (medium): clear / light blue, or light blue / dark blue
- Alexandrite (strong): dark red-purple / orange / green
- Apatite (strong): blue-yellow / blue-colorless
- Benitoite (strong): colorless / dark blue
- Cordierite (aka Iolite) (orthorhombic; very strong): pale yellow / violet / pale blue
- Corundum (strong): dark violet-blue / light blue-green
- Tanzanite See Zoisite
- Topaz (very low): colorless / pale blue / pink
- Tourmaline (strong): dark blue / light blue
- Zoisite (strong): blue / red-purple / yellow-green
- Zircon (strong): blue / clear / gray

=== Green ===
- Alexandrite (strong): dark red / orange / green
- Andalusite (strong): brown-green / dark red
- Corundum (strong): green / yellow-green
- Emerald (strong): green / blue-green
- Peridot (low): yellow-green / green / colorless
- Titanite (medium): brown-green / blue-green
- Tourmaline (strong): blue-green / brown-green / yellow-green
- Zircon (low): greenish brown / green
- Kornerupine (strong): green / pale yellowish-brown / reddish-brown
- Hiddenite (strong): blue-green / emerald-green / yellow-green

=== Yellow ===
- Citrine (very weak): different shades of pale yellow
- Chrysoberyl (very weak): red-yellow / yellow-green / green
- Corundum (weak): yellow / pale yellow
- Danburite (weak): very pale yellow / pale yellow
- Kasolite (weak): pale yellow / grey
- Orthoclase (weak): different shades of pale yellow
- Phenacite (medium): colorless / yellow-orange
- Spodumene (medium): different shades of pale yellow
- Topaz (medium): tan / yellow / yellow-orange
- Tourmaline (medium): pale yellow / dark yellow
- Zircon (weak): tan / yellow
- Hornblende (strong): light green / dark green / yellow / brown
- Segnitite (weak): pale to medium yellow

=== Brown and orange ===
- Corundum (strong): yellow-brown / orange
- Topaz (medium): brown-yellow / dull brown-yellow
- Tourmaline (very low): dark brown / light brown
- Zircon (very weak): brown-red / brown-yellow
- Biotite (medium): brown

=== Red and pink ===
- Alexandrite (strong): dark red / orange / green
- Andalusite (strong): dark red / brown-red
- Corundum (strong): violet-red / orange-red
- Morganite (medium): light red / red-violet
- Tourmaline (strong): dark red / light red
- Zircon (medium): purple / red-brown

== See also ==
- Birefringence
- Medieval sunstone
- Physical crystallography before X-rays
