= Gemmological Association of Australia =

Organisation in Australia

Gemmological Association of Australia (GAA) is an association that was formed to promote the education of the science of gemmology and the study of gemstones as a safeguard to the public against spurious stones.

The inaugural meeting of the association was held in the School of Arts Building, Pitt Street, Sydney on 29 October 1945.

The association has divisions in six states of Australia, the smallest being Tasmania Division.
