= Gemological Science International =

Independent gemological organization

Gemological Science International (GSI)
- Established: 2005
- Location: New York City, New York, United States
- Website: www.gemscience.net

Gemological Science International, or GSI, is an independent gemological organization that is one of the largest gemological entities in the world, with offices in four continents.

Founded in New York City in 2005 by Mark Gershburg and Debbie Azar, GSI's laboratory division provides diamond and gemstone grading and identification services as well as gemological research, and a variety of educational programs for gemological professionals. GSI also acts as a resource of gem and jewelry information for trade press, global media organizations and the general public.

GSI’s worldwide headquarters is located in New York City’s Diamond District. GSI has laboratories in India (Mumbai, Surat and Thrissur); the Israel (Ramat Gan); UAE (Dubai); Belgium (Antwerp); Botswana (Gaborone); and Hong Kong.

== Gemological laboratory services ==
GSI Gemological Laboratory performs a number of services including: loose and mounted diamonds grading; origin testing of loose and mounted diamonds and gemstones; cut grade analysis; light analysis reports; gemstone identification; sorting and screening of melee; treatment identification; laser inscription on diamonds and gemstones; metal engraving; metal inspection; and 360-degree virtual imaging. GSI became the first gem lab to implement leading edge technologies to test all loose diamonds and gemstones for their origin.

GSI offers different types of grading and identification reports, issued with differing formats, details, and prices. Each report includes educational materials to help consumers understand the information in the context of personal jewelry and diamond purchases.

== Social responsibility ==
GSI participates in trade organizations including the Jewelers Security Alliance, Jewelers Vigilance Committee, Responsible Jewellery Council (RJC), Dubai Multi Commodities Centre (DMCC), Israel Diamond Exchange (IDE), Jewelers for Children (JFC), Women’s Jewelry Association, Bharat Diamond Bourse, Antwerp Diamond Club and more. GSI helps to increase exposure for leading jewelry designers by sponsoring showcase events of their work.

In May, 2018, GSI co-founder Debbie Azar was appointed to The Responsible Jewellery Council (RJC) Board of Directors.
