= Ove Johansson =

Swedish American football player (1948–2023)

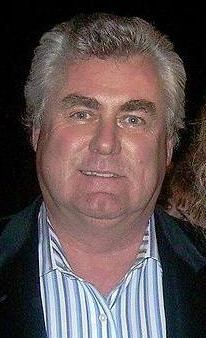
- Johansson in 2006

No. 10
- Position: Placekicker

Personal information
- Born: March 31, 1948; Gothenburg, Sweden
- Died: September 30, 2023 (aged 75); Amarillo, Texas, U.S.
- Listed height: 5 ft 10 in (1.78 m)
- Listed weight: 175 lb (79 kg)

Career information
- College: Abilene Christian
- NFL draft: 1977: 12th round, 316th overall pick

Career history
- Philadelphia Eagles (1977)

Career NFL statistics
- Field goals: 1 / 4
- FG%: 25
- Extra points: 1 / 3
- Stats at Pro Football Reference

Ove Claes Johansson (March 31, 1948 – September 30, 2023) was a Swedish American football placekicker who kicked what was then the longest field goal in the sport's history at 69 yards (63 m) in 1976. Johansson is the oldest player to be drafted in the NFL draft, being 28 years, 281 days old when he was selected in the 12th round of the 1977 NFL draft by the Houston Oilers.

Johansson was a junior at Abilene Christian University after being an all American soccer player at national power Davis and Elkins College, and performed this kick during ACU's 1976 homecoming game against East Texas State University at Shotwell Stadium, in Abilene, Texas. This record kick stood as the longest of any other field goal kicked in organized football for 49 years, one yard longer than the current high school record set by Dirk Borgognone in 1985, two yards longer than the NCAA record (Abilene Christian was playing in the National Association of Intercollegiate Athletics at the time), and three yards longer than the official NFL record of 66 yards set by Justin Tucker in the Baltimore Ravens vs. Detroit Lions game of September 26, 2021. Johansson's record was eventually broken by Cam Little in 2025 during an NFL preseason game, when Little kicked a 70-yard field goal.

== Professional career ==
Johansson had previously played association football, and the 1976 season was his first and only season to play college football. He hurt his knee in a season-ending bowl game and played in just two regular season games in the National Football League. Kicking for the Philadelphia Eagles in 1977, he was successful in only one of his four field goal attempts and one of three extra points. Johansson was the first Swedish-born player to play in the NFL, twelve years before Björn Nittmo.

== Personal life and death ==
Johansson was a businessman and motivational speaker in Amarillo, Texas, and was married to April (Bankes) Johansson. They have a daughter and a son. The family is bilingual English-Swedish.

Ove Johansson died on September 30, 2023, at the age of 75.
