= GCI Gemological Laboratories & College =

Gemological laboratory and college

- Founded: 1998
- Headquarters: Israel
- Website: www.gci.co.il

GCI Gemological Laboratories & College is a gemological laboratory and a college for educational services founded in 1998.

== History ==
In 2016, eBay Israel started a partnership with the Israel Diamond Exchange to boost diamond sales on eBay. GCI launched an eBay-diamond exchange course to bring educational resources around this new concept.

== Description ==
GCI Gemological Laboratories & College's main headquarters is in the Israel Diamond Exchange in Ramat Gan. The GCI has regional labs and educational centers equipped with local and Israeli staff in Russia and, since June 2006, in India—a disposition of four branches in Mumbai, Delhi, Hyderabad and Kolkata.

CEO Miki Ben-Dor described GCI as a small-scale "boutique" lab that makes tailor-made diamond services more accessible.

GCI is the only western laboratory that is officially permitted by the Russian government to operate in Russia.

As a licensed member of the Association of Gemological Laboratories of Japan (AGL), the gemological laboratory TGL Israel is officially registered and recognized by JJA/AGL Master Stones (color) administrative committee. GCI is working under the strict standard institution of International Organization for Standardization (ISO).

GCI conducts research on gemstones. Publications are published on the laboratory's official website.

The college offers various courses in diamond grading, gem identification and practical work.
