= Josh Barrett (American football) =

American football player (born 1984)

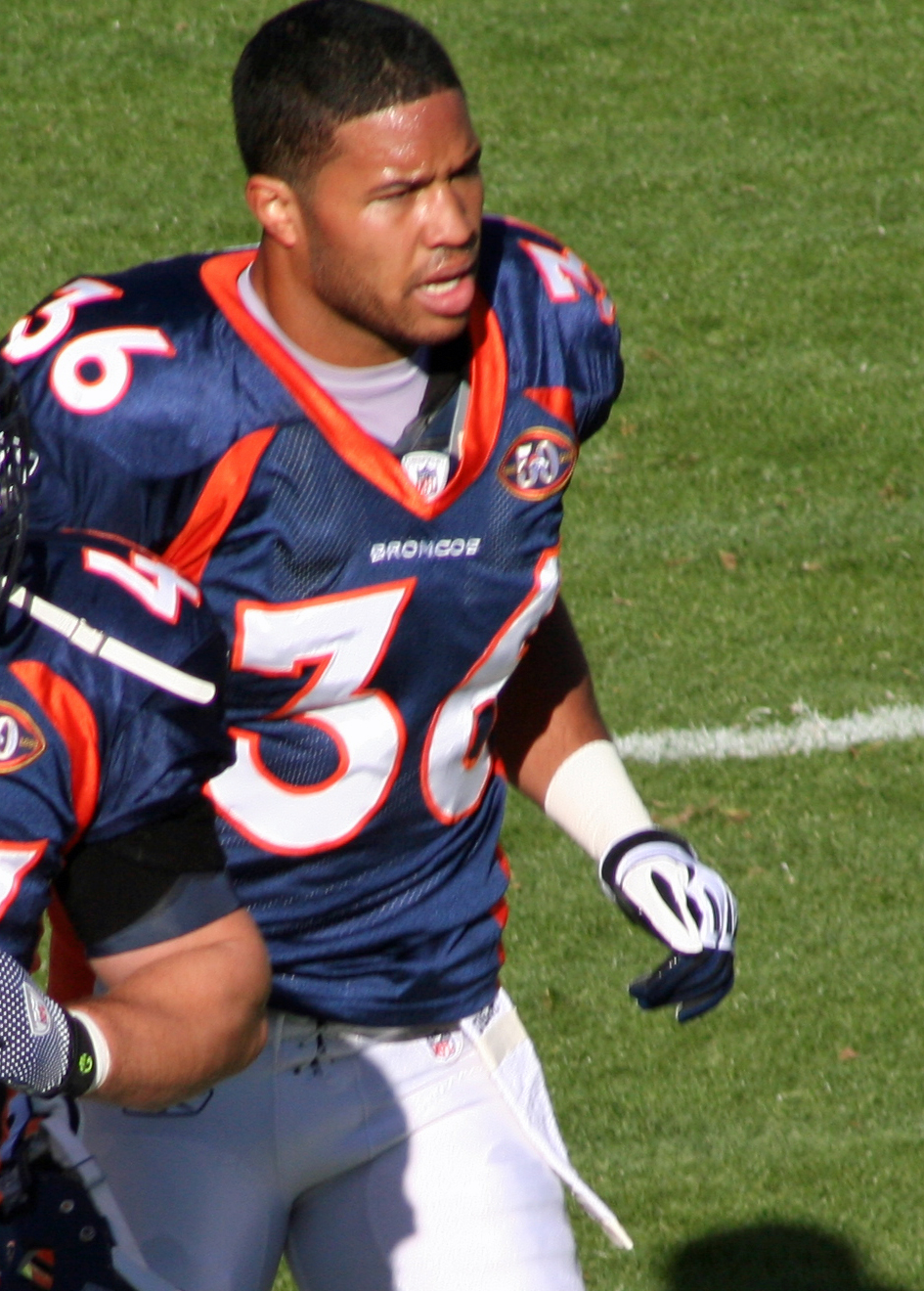
- Barrett with the Denver Broncos in 2009

No. 36, 30
- Position: Safety

Personal information
- Born: November 22, 1984 (age 41); Reno, Nevada, U.S.
- Listed height: 6 ft 2 in (1.88 m)
- Listed weight: 226 lb (103 kg)

Career information
- High school: Reno
- College: Arizona State
- NFL draft: 2008: 7th round, 220th overall pick

Career history
- Denver Broncos (2008−2009); New England Patriots (2010−2012)

Career NFL statistics
- Total tackles: 49
- Interceptions: 1
- Passes defended: 4
- Stats at Pro Football Reference

Joshua Robert Barrett (born November 22, 1984) is an American former professional football player who was a safety in the National Football League (NFL). He was selected by the Denver Broncos in the seventh round of the 2008 NFL draft. He played college football for the Arizona State Sun Devils.

== Early life ==
Barrett was born in Reno, Nevada. He played high school football, basketball, and one year of baseball at Reno High School. He was an all state football selection as a senior. Barrett was recruited by a number of colleges to play football.

== College career ==
Following high school, Barrett attended Arizona State University. As a true freshman in 2003, he played in the first game of the season before suffering a shoulder injury and redshirting. He played in 10 games, starting four, in 2004, recording 17 tackles. As a sophomore in 2005, Barrett started two of the twelve games he played and finished with 37 tackles, one interception, and a sack. He received honorable mention All-Pac-10 honors as a junior in 2006 after leading the Sun Devils in tackles (82) and interceptions (3) as a 13-game starter. Barrett finished his collegiate career with 10 takeaways, totaling six interceptions and four fumble recoveries in 47 career games (27 starts) at Arizona State. He posted a career-high seven pass breakups in 11 games (8 starts) as a senior for the Sun Devils. He missed three games early in the year due to injuries but finished the year with 38 tackles (25 solo), one sack (9 yds.), one interception and one fumble recovery.

== Professional career ==
=== Denver Broncos ===
Barrett was selected in the seventh round (220th overall) in the 2008 NFL draft by the Denver Broncos. He was waived by the Broncos on August 30, 2008, and re-signed the next day to their practice squad. On November 23, 2008, Barrett was elevated to the Broncos' active roster. He played in the final six games of the season, starting the last three. He finished with 22 tackles and one interception. In 2009, Barrett played in 14 games, with no starts, and recorded 10 tackles on the season.

=== New England Patriots ===
On August 5, 2010, Barrett was waived/injured by the Broncos with a shoulder injury. If he had cleared waivers, Barrett would have reverted to the Broncos' injured reserve list. However, he was claimed by the New England Patriots on August 6. He was placed on injured reserve on August 31, the first day the team could do so without exposing him to waivers.
