= Canadian Institute of Gemmology =

Educational institution

The Canadian Institute of Gemmology (CIG) is a non-profit, post-secondary gemmological educational institution in Canada. The C.I.G. is dedicated to research and advancement in education in the field of gemmology. Their mandate is to provide gemmology-related training to the jewelry industry and the general public.

The institute is based in British Columbia, Canada, and provides classes, correspondence courses, and a variety of gemmological instruments.
