= Gemological Institute of America =

Research institute in Carlsbad, California

Gemological Institute of America (GIA)
- Type: Private
- Established: 1931
- Head: Pritesh Patel
- Faculty: 21 Gemology & 9 Jewelry Arts Instructors
- Location: Carlsbad, California, United States
- Website: www.gia.edu

The Gemological Institute of America (GIA) is a nonprofit institute based in Carlsbad, California. It is dedicated to research and education in the field of gemology and the jewelry arts. Founded in 1931, GIA's mission is to protect buyers and sellers of gemstones by setting and maintaining the standards used to evaluate gemstone quality. The institute does so through research, gem identification, diamond grading services, and a variety of educational programs. Through its library and subject experts, GIA acts as a resource of gem and jewelry information for the trade, public, and media.

In 1953, the GIA developed its International Diamond Grading System and the "four Cs" (cut, clarity, color, and carat weight) as a standard to compare and evaluate the quality of diamonds.

As of 1997, the institute was headquartered in Carlsbad, California, and operates in 13 countries, with 11 campuses, 9 laboratories, and 4 research centers.

== History ==
GIA was founded in the 1920s by Robert M. Shipley. Shipley was a successful jeweler, but realizing his lack of expertise decided to travel to Europe. There, he completed the Great Britain National Association of Goldsmiths gemological correspondence course. After, Shipley returned to Los Angeles. There, he launched his own preliminary course in gemology on September 16, 1930, to train and certify jewelers. The jewelers he certified would eventually form a national guild of jewelers.

The first GIA gemological laboratory was established in Los Angeles in 1931. Shortly thereafter, the institute introduced the "Certified Gemologist" professional designation. Vincent Manson, then Director of Strategic Planning, moved the GIA campus and headquarters from Santa Monica, California to Carlsbad, California in 1996, officially opening in 1997.

In 2005, an allegation of bribery was made against GIA lab workers, casting doubt on the integrity of diamond grading labs. The accusation involved a dealer who claimed that their lab workers engaged in fraudulent activities related to the grading of two diamonds. Subsequent independent testing revealed discrepancies in the grading of these two diamonds, leading to suspicions that lab workers privy to the situation were complicit. This led to an internal probe being initiated at the GIA, which ran for four months. The probe unearthed Midtown lab workers' contact with clients, an act which is prohibited by GIA code of ethics. The fraudulent ratings and GIA code of ethics violations were acknowledged by chairman of the GIA, Ralph Destino. The internal probe ended in October 2005, resulting in the firing of four lab workers and the head of the laboratory.

Internal investigation was also initiated due to a lawsuit filed in April 2005 by Max Pincione, a jewelry dealer and former head of retail operations at the jeweler Harry Winston. The lawsuit was filed against Vivid Collection LLC, Moty Spector, Ali Khazeneh and the GIA alleging that Vivid made payments to the GIA to upgrade the quality of the diamonds submitted for grading which he further sold to the members of Saudi Royal family. On discovering the fraud the members of Saudi Royal family demanded their money back and refused to do any further business with Pincione.

== Research ==
GIA is engaged in research to advance the science of gemology. Historically, research has focused on developing methods and technologies to identify and characterize gems. This research has advanced in the ability to differentiate gems and identify simulants, particularly diamond simulants. GIA was also responsible for the first modern diamond grading reports, where it introduced grading methodologies for diamond color and diamond clarity.

Current research at gemological laboratories concerns the development of improved detection techniques for treated and synthetic diamonds, as well as for treated sapphires, rubies and pearls.

== Laboratory services ==
The GIA Laboratory provides a variety of gem grading and identification reports for diamonds over 0.15 carats. Diamond grading reports for unmounted natural and laboratory grown diamonds determine their key characteristics: color, clarity, cut and carat weight. GIA issues several types of reports for natural diamonds, the most popular for diamonds over 1 carat being the Diamond Grading Report. A briefer and less expensive version, called a Diamond Dossier, is often used for diamonds under 1 carat. While both reports contain a number of measurements, including dimensions, proportions, carat weight, color, and clarity, the Diamond Grading Report also includes a diamond plot (a graphic representation of the position and type of inclusions present in the diamond). Diamond reports from GIA (as well as other, for-profit sources) are now demanded by most consumers purchasing diamonds over a certain size, typically for over 0.5 carat (100 mg), and almost always for over 1.0 carat (200 mg), and are considered an important tool in guaranteeing that a diamond is accurately represented to a potential buyer.

GIA colored stone identification reports may include a comment about any treatments detected and an opinion of country of origin for stones such as ruby, sapphire, emerald and tourmaline. Pearl reports specify the weight, size, shape, color, origin (natural or cultured) and presence of treatments.

For colored gemstones and pearls, GIA reports include advanced analyses such as spectroscopy. These tests are used to detect treatments and enhancements, identify the exact gem species, and, when possible, determine the geographic origin of the stone. This technical data provides objective information regarding the gemstone's physical properties and rarity.

== Education ==
GIA offers several programs and courses online through an interactive eLearning format, and through its 12 campus locations around the world. The institute also offers corporate training programs and works with trade organizations worldwide to provide technical training in gemstones and jewelry.

GIA's Carlsbad and New York on-campus courses are accredited by the Accrediting Commission of Career Schools and Colleges (ACCSC). Its Distance Education courses are accredited by the Accrediting Commission of the Distance Education and Training Council (DETC).

The following recognized credentials are attainable upon completion of their corresponding Diploma Program:

- Graduate Gemologist (GG)
- Graduate Jeweler (GJ)
- Jewelry Design & Technology (JDT)
- Graduate Diamonds (GD)
- Graduate Colored Stones (GCS)
- Graduate Pearls (GP)
- Applied Jewelry Professional (AJP)

GIA also exists to educate the gem and jewelry industry and the general public through its publications and outreach efforts. Most notable of these efforts is the quarterly publication of the journal Gems & Gemology.

== Library and Information Center ==
The Richard T. Liddicoat Gemological Library and Information Center, located at GIA's headquarters in Carlsbad, California has a collection of 38,000 books, 700 international magazines and journals, 1,000 videos/DVDs, 80,000 digital images, 300 maps, and approximately 6,000 original jewelry design renderings.

The collection contains works published from 1496 to the present, encompassing the history and modern development of gemology. Subjects include natural and synthetic gemstones, gem treatments, jewelry design, manufacturing, and marketing.

The Liddicoat Library is open to the public and the jewelry trade for on-campus research. The library catalog and other resources are available through the website. A reference staff with gemological expertise is on hand to answer questions and may be contacted by e-mail or telephone.

== GIA instruments ==
GIA also designs and manufactures professional equipment for grading, identifying, and selling diamonds and colored gemstones. These instruments are used to determine the physical and optical properties of gems and analyze their microscopic features.

The first GIA instrument, a 10x eye loupe, was introduced in the early 1930s. Darkfield illumination, a lighting technique that makes gem inclusions easily visible in the microscope, was patented by Robert M. Shipley, Jr., the son of GIA's founder.

== See also ==
- Canadian Gemmological Association
- Antwerp World Diamond Centre
