= American Gem Society =

American trade association

Logo of the American Gem Society

The American Gem Society (AGS) is a trade association of retail jewelers, independent appraisers, suppliers, and selective industry members, which was founded in 1934 by Robert M. Shipley.

The Society is based in Las Vegas, Nevada, along with the affiliated American Gem Society Laboratories (AGSL) (founded in 1996) and the American Gem Society Advanced Instruments Division (founded in 2004).

The Society trains and certifies jewelers, gemologists, and jewelry appraisers. Diamond grading is a specialty of the American Gem Society Laboratories and the Society has developed its own cut, color, and clarity standards.

== History ==
The AGS was created by Robert M. Shipley. During the 1920s, Shipley was operating quite successfully as a jeweler. However, despite his years in the industry, his lack of expertise regarding gems and jewelry was revealed to him by a pair of his best customers. Humbled by this revelation, Shipley realized that this was a big problem among American jewelers, one which likely accounted for much of the public's distrust for the profession at the time. Shipley lost his jewelry stores in a divorce and went to Europe, where he completed the Great Britain National Association of Goldsmiths gemological correspondence course. He brought his newfound expertise back to Los Angeles, where he founded his own preliminary course in gemology on September 16, 1930. For the next few years, he worked to promote the need for gemological education and train a new breed of "certified" jewelers. These jewelers would form the foundation of the Gemological Institute of America (GIA), and later the AGS.

In its history, the AGS has achieved significant accomplishments within the field of gemology and jewelry.
Among these are the following:

- Invented the industry's first scientifically reviewed, objective, and repeatable Cut Grade method.
- Created the Ideal Cut Grade for Round Brilliant shaped diamonds, often known as the AGS Ideal or the Triple Zero Cut.
- Offered the industry's first diamond grading reports with a Cut Grade for Princess, Emerald, Oval, and other fancy diamond shapes.

== Laboratory services ==
A big part of the AGS operation comes in the form of AGS Laboratories, which offers laboratory services to members of the jewelry industry. Primary among these are their diamond grading services. Jewelers are able to have their diamonds scientifically evaluated according to the Four Cs: Color, Clarity, Cut, and Carat Weight. They are then given a diamond grading report, which can be provided to a consumer in order to verify the quality of the diamond they are purchasing.

Additionally, AGS Laboratories offers laser inscription services. Through the use of a microlaser beam, the laboratory can inscribe a diamond with a serial number, a company logo, or other text on the stone. This service does not affect the quality of the diamond, and is generally performed on the girdle where it can only be viewed with a magnification device.
