= Gemology =

Science dealing with natural and artificial gemstone materials

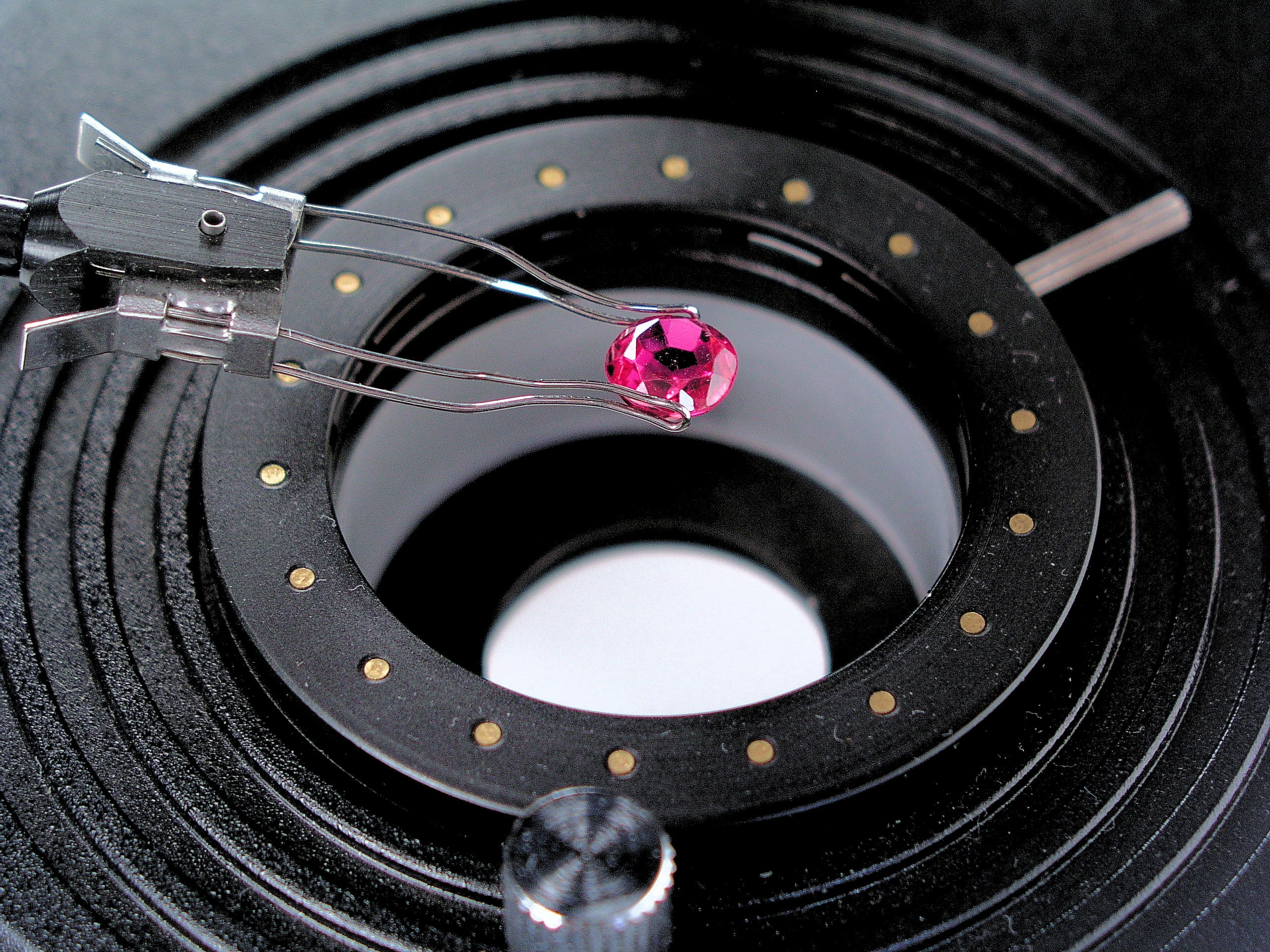
Examining a pink sapphire under a gemmological microscope

Gemology or gemmology is the science dealing with natural and artificial gemstone materials. It is a specific interdisciplinary branch of mineralogy. Some jewelers (and many non-jewelers) are academically trained gemologists and are qualified to identify and evaluate gems.

== History ==
Rudimentary education in gemology for jewellers and gemologists began in the nineteenth century, but the first qualifications were instigated after the National Association of Goldsmiths of Great Britain (NAG) set up as an Education Committee for this purpose in 1908. The committee emerged as a distinct branch of NAG (named the Gemmological Association) in 1931, shortly after the incorporation of the Gemological Institute of America (GIA). In 1938 the branch was renamed as the Gemmological Association of Great Britain, before being incorporated in 1947. The organisation is now an educational charity and accredited awarding body with its courses taught worldwide.

The first US graduate of Gem-A's diploma course, in 1929, was Robert Shipley, who then established both the Gemological Institute of America and the American Gem Society. There are now several professional schools and associations of gemologists and certification programs around the world.

The first gemological laboratory serving the jewelry trade was established in London in 1925, prompted by the influx of the newly developed "cultured pearl" and advances in the synthesis of rubies and sapphires. There are now numerous gem laboratories around the world requiring ever more advanced equipment and experience to identify the new challenges – such as treatments to gems, new synthetics, and other new materials.

== Background ==
It is often difficult to obtain an expert judgement from a neutral laboratory. Analysis and estimation in the gemstone trade usually have to take place on site. Professional gemologists and gemstone buyers use mobile laboratories, which pool all necessary instruments in a travel case. Such so-called travel labs even have their own current supply, which makes them independent from infrastructure. They are also suitable for gemological expeditions.

Gemstones are basically categorized based on their crystal structure, specific gravity, refractive index, and other optical properties, such as pleochroism. The physical property of "hardness" is defined by the irregular Mohs scale of mineral hardness.

Gemologists study these factors while valuing or appraising cut and polished gemstones. Gemological microscopic study of the internal structure is used to determine whether a gem is synthetic or natural by revealing natural fluid inclusions or partially melted exogenous crystals that are evidence of heat treatment to enhance color.

The spectroscopic analysis of cut gemstones also allows a gemologist to understand the atomic structure and identify its origin, which is a major factor in valuing a gemstone. For example, a ruby from Myanmar (Burma) will have definite internal and optical activity variance from a Thai ruby.

When the gemstones are in a rough state, the gemologist studies the external structure; the host rock and mineral association; and natural and polished color. Initially, the stone is identified by its color, refractive index, optical character, specific gravity, and examination of internal characteristics under magnification.

== Gemological instruments ==
Gemologists use a variety of tools and equipment which allow for the accurate tests to be performed in order to identify a gemstone by its specific characteristics and properties.

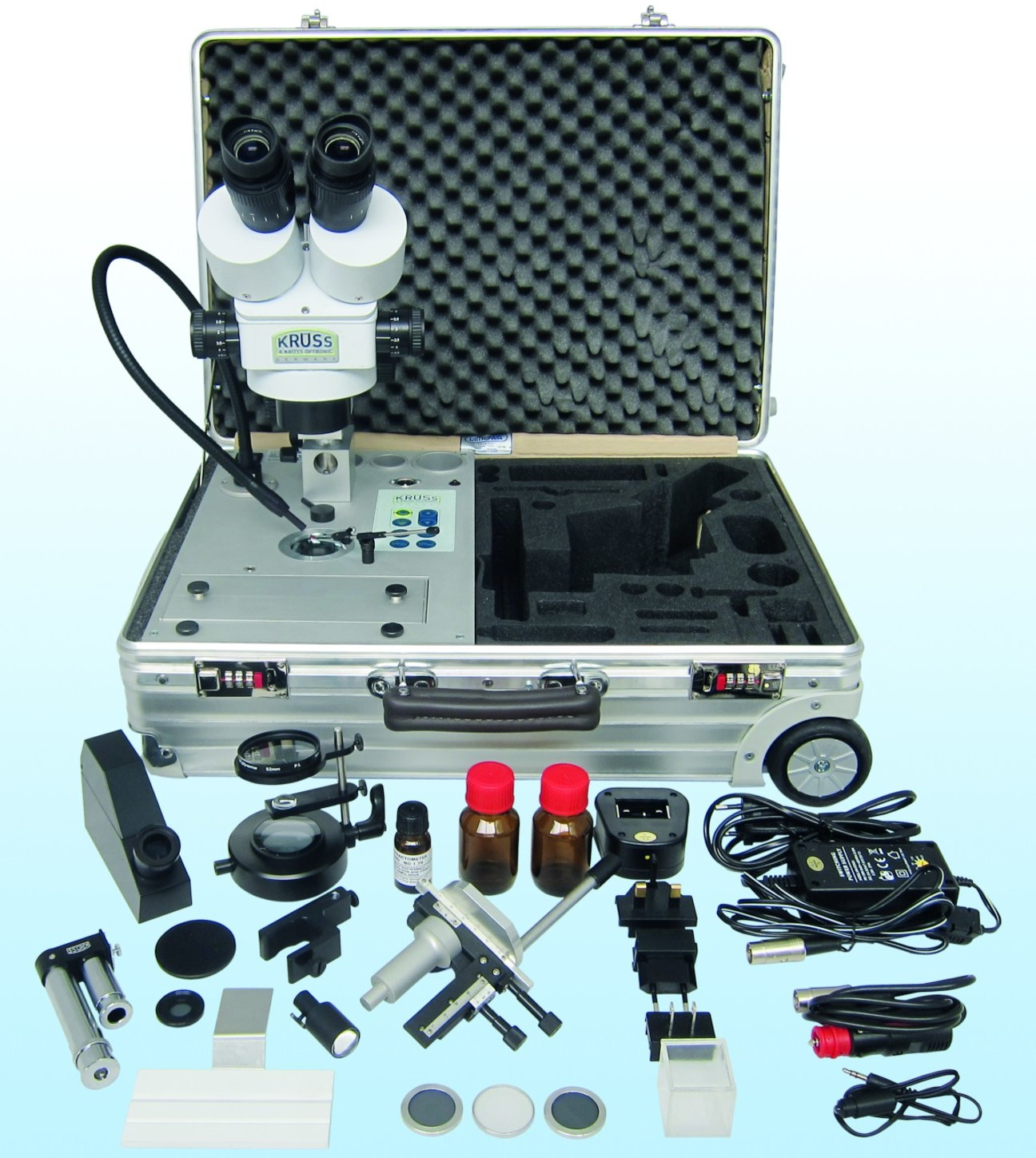
Gemmological travel lab KA52KRS

These include:

- Corrected 10× loupe
- Microscope
- Refractometer
  - Polarising filter
  - Magnifying eyepiece
  - Contact liquid for RI (refractive index) up to 1.81
- Polariscope
  - Optic figure sphere
- Dichroscope
- Spectroscope (handheld or desktop)
- Penlight
- Tweezers
- Stone cloth
- Color filter
- Immersion cell
- Ultraviolet lamp
- Raman spectrometer
- FTIR spectrometer
- Photoluminescence spectroscopy system
- EDXRF spectrometer

== General identification of gems ==
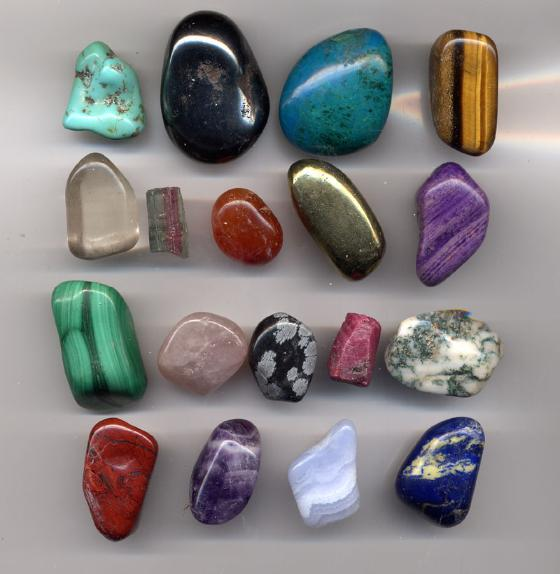
A selection of ornamental, non-precious stones made by tumbling rough pebbles with abrasive grit in a rotating drum. The biggest pebble here is 40 millimetres (1.6 in) long.

Gem identification is basically a process of elimination. Gemstones of similar color undergo non-destructive optical testing until there is only one possible identity.

Any single test is nearly always only indicative. For example: The specific gravity of ruby is 4.00, glass is 3.15–4.20, and cubic zirconia is 5.6–5.9. So one can easily tell the difference between cubic zirconia and the other two; however, there is overlap between ruby and glass.

As with all naturally occurring materials, no two gems are identical. The geological environment they are created in influences the overall process so that although the basics can be identified, the presence of chemical "impurities", and substitutions along with structural imperfections create "individuals".

=== Identification by refractive index ===
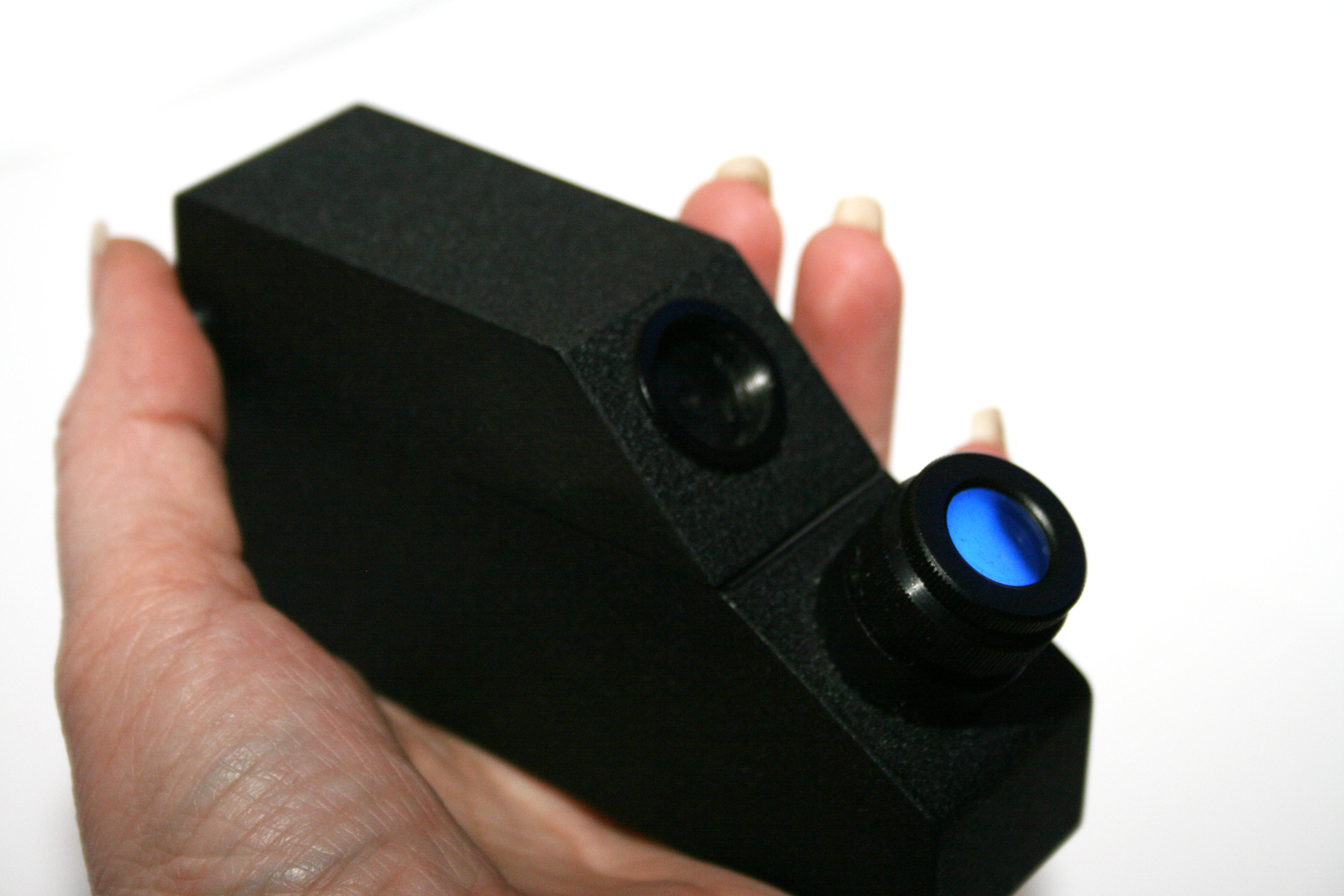
Traditional handheld refractometer

One test to determine the gem's identity is to measure the refraction of light in the gem. Essentially, when light passes from one medium to another, it bends. Blue light bends more than red light. How much the light bends will vary depending on the gem mineral.

Every material has a critical angle, above which point light is reflected back internally. This can be measured and thus used to determine the gem's identity. Typically this is measured using a refractometer, although it is possible to measure it using a microscope.

=== Identification by specific gravity ===
Specific gravity, also known as relative density, varies depending upon the chemical composition and crystal structure type. Heavy liquids with a known specific gravity are used to test loose gemstones.

Specific gravity is measured by comparing the weight of the gem in air with the weight of the gem suspended in water.

=== Identification by spectroscopy ===
This method uses a similar principle to how a prism works to separate white light into its component colors. A gemological spectroscope is employed to analyze the selective absorption of light in the gem material. Coloring agents or chromophores show bands in the spectroscope and indicate which element is responsible for the gem's color.

=== Identification by inclusions ===
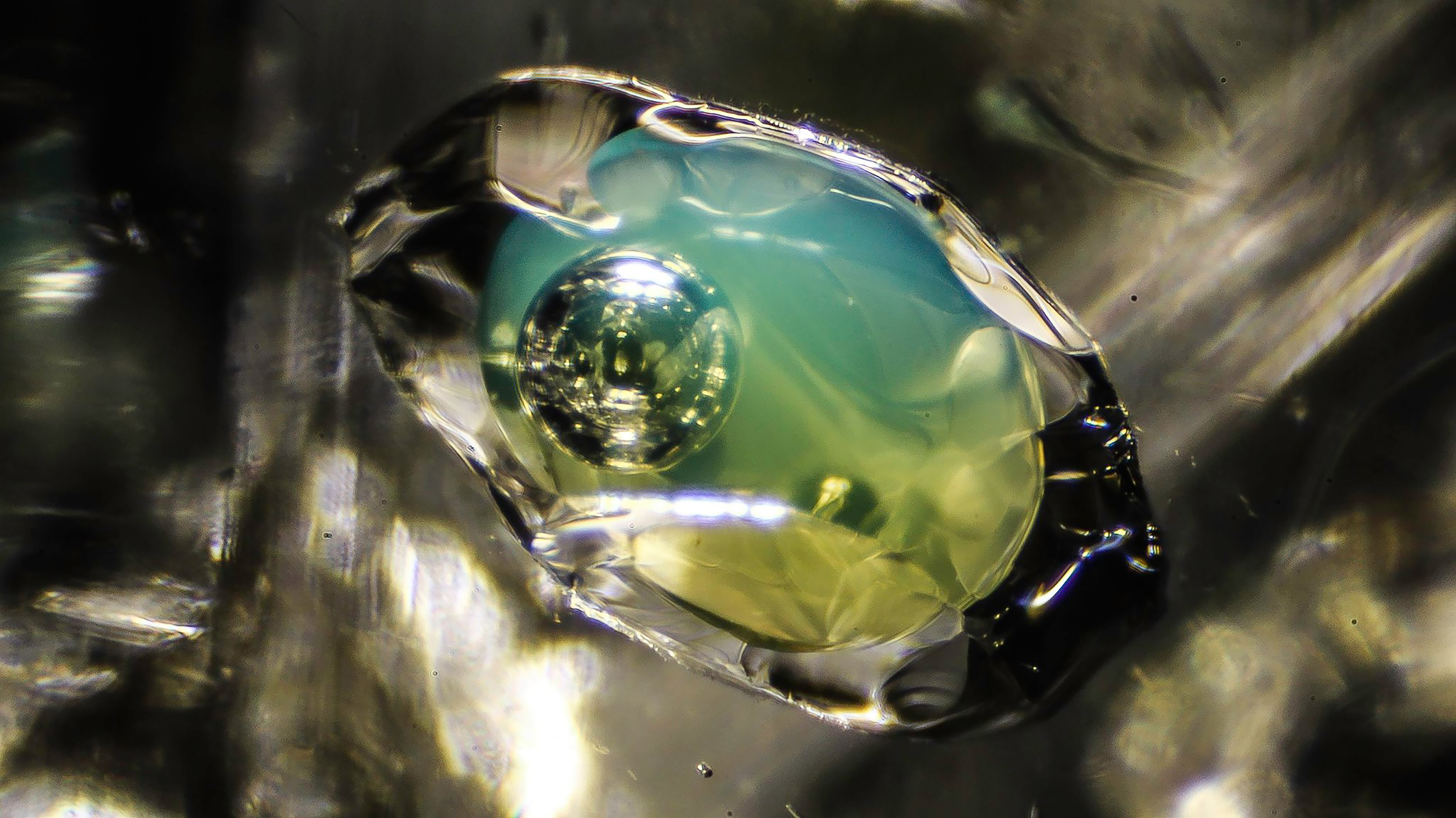
Three inclusion phases in rock crystal quartz

Inclusions can help gemologists to determine whether or not a gemstone is natural, synthetic or treated (i.e. fracture-filled or heated).

=== Identification by flaws and striations ===
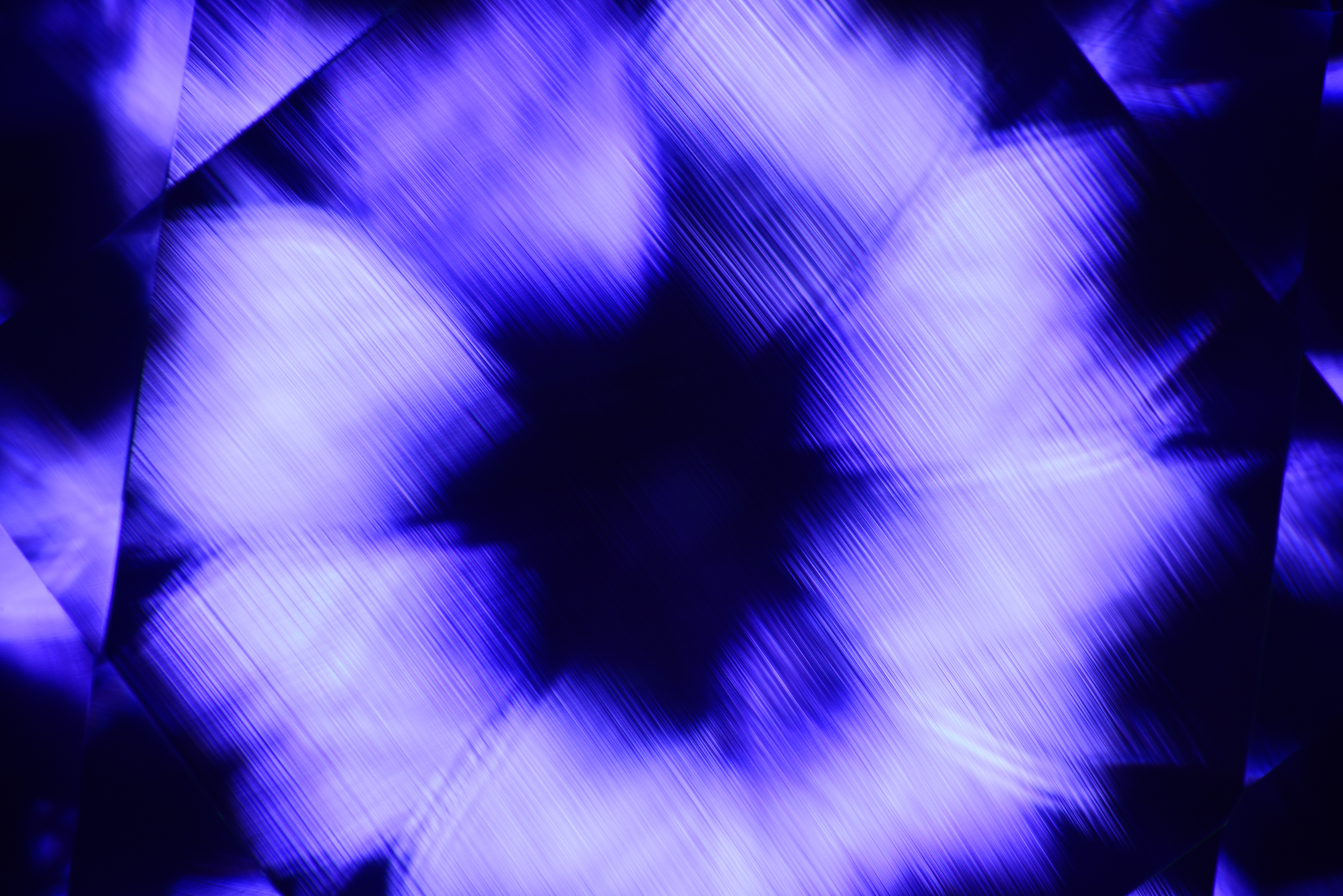
The curvature observed in this synthetic color-change sapphire is due to a process known as the Verneuil process or, flame fusion.

During the Verneuil process for synthesizing gems, a fine crushed material is heated at extremely high temperatures. The powdered gem mineral is then melted (or a metallic mixture directly burned in an oxygen flame) the residue of which then drips through a furnace onto a boule. The boule where the corundum or spinel cools down and crystallizes, spins and thus causes the curved striations, which are diagnostic for a lab-created gem: Natural corundum does not show curved striations.

Likewise, natural stones, particularly beryl minerals, show small flaws – short planar cracks where the direction of the crystalline orientation in the gem abruptly changes. The natural formation of gemstones tends to layer the minerals in regular crystalline sheets, whereas many synthetically produced gems have an amorphous structure, like glass. Synthetics made by the Verneuil process either do not show flaws at all, or if any flaws are present, show curvy, undulating surfaces rather than flat ones.

== Institutes, laboratories, schools, and publications ==
=== Institutes ===
- American Gem Society – AGS
- Asian Institute of Gemological Sciences – AIGS
- Canadian Gemmological Association – CGA
- Canadian Institute of Gemmology – CIG
- Gemological Science International – GSI
- Gemmological Association of Australia – GAA
- Gemmological Association of Great Britain – Gem-A
- Gemmological Institute of India – GII
- Gemological Institute of America – GIA
- German Gemmological Association – DGemG
- Hoge Raad voor Diamant – HRD
- International Gemological Institute – IGI
- Swiss Gemmological Institute – SSEF

=== Commercial laboratories ===
- Advanced Gem Testing Laboratory – AGTL
- American Gemological Laboratories – AGL
- European Gemological Laboratory – EGL
- Gübelin Gem Lab – GGL
- GRS Gemresearch Swisslab – GRS
- Guild Gem Laboratories
- Laboratoire français de gemmologie – LFG
- Professional gemstone testing laboratory – PGTL
- Himalaya gem testing laboratory – HGTL
- Universal Gemological Laboratories – GCI

=== Publications ===
- The Journal of Gemmology (Note: The Journal of Gemmology publishes original research articles on all aspects of gemmology, including natural stones and their treatments, synthetics and simulated gemstones. The Journal is currently published by Gemmological Association of Great Britain (Gem-A) in collaboration with the Swiss Gemmological Institute (SSEF) and with support from American Gemological Laboratories (AGL).)
- Gems & Gemology
- IGR – Rivista Italiana di Gemmologia – Italian Gemological Review
- Gemology Frontier
