= World Jewellery Confederation =

- Confédération Internationale de la Bijouterie, Joaillerie, Orfèvrerie des Diamants, Perles et Pierres
- Formation: 1926
- Type: Trade organization
- Website: http://www.cibjo.org

The World Jewellery Confederation (French: Confédération Internationale de la Bijouterie, Joaillerie, Orfèvrerie des Diamants, Perles et Pierres), has its headquarters in Bern, Switzerland. Frequently referred to by its French acronym, CIBJO, it represents the interests of all involved in jewellery, gemstones, and precious metals, from mine to marketplace.

== History ==
Founded in Paris in 1926 as BIBOA to represent the interests of the European jewellery trade, it was restructured in 1961 as CIBJO with a worldwide focus. Representing individuals and companies across the diamond, gemstone, jewelry and precious metal sectors, its membership spans over 40 countries.

In 2006, CIBJO received consultative status with United Nations Economic and Social Council (ECOSOC) of the United Nations, under Article 71 of the UN Charter, which allows for CIBJO to consult with ECOSOC, governments, and the UN Secretariat on behalf of matters concerning the gem and jewelry trade.

CIBJO serves to protect the trust of consumers relying on the jewelry industry, protecting their interests and regulating standards within the trade. The non-profit has an annual Congress, which serves as a meeting point for the industry to discuss ethics, problems and best practice.

== CIBJO Blue Book ==
CIBJO Blue Books define grading standards and nomenclature for diamonds, coloured gemstones, pearls, precious metals, and gemmological laboratories. The standards are studied, compiled, and updated by member-representatives. CIBJO claims that they are the most widely accepted set of globally accepted standards. They are subject to annual review.

== Views ==
=== Corporate social responsibility ===
The theme of the CIBJO 2007 Congress in Cape Town, was “Delivering a Sustainable and Responsible Jewellery Industry,” to address the industry’s role in developing sustainable economies in the developing countries where raw materials are sourced. It released the Cape Town Declaration to create programmes that will help achieve the UN’s Millennium Development Goals. Later the same year it also agreed to work with ECOSOC to create an educational body that would promote corporate social responsibility in the jewellery industry. In 2008, CIBJO established the World Jewellery Confederation Education Foundation (WJCEF), to help educate members of the industry about the principles of corporate social responsibility, and how to implement these principles in their businesses.

=== Lab-grown diamonds ===
CIBJO 2025, which was co-sponsored by the De Beers diamond mining company, promoted the term synthetic diamonds instead of lab-grown diamonds, as a way to encourage sale of the more expensive natural diamonds.
