= Gems & Gemology =

- Discipline: Mineralogy
- Language: English

Publication details
- History: 1934-present
- Publisher: Gemological Institute of America (USA)
- Frequency: Quarterly
- Impact factor: 0.793 (2016)

Standard abbreviations
- ISO 4: Gems Gemol.

Indexing
- ISSN: 0016-626X
- OCLC no.: 2447141

Links
- Journal homepage

Gems & Gemology is a quarterly scientific journal published by the Gemological Institute of America. Each issue is devoted to research on diamonds, gemstones, and pearls. Topics include geographic sources, imitations and synthetics, treatments, and identification techniques. Established in January 1934, Gems & Gemology is geared toward jewelry professionals and gemologists.

Issues contain research articles, updates from the GIA Laboratory and international gemology news. Gems & Gemology is abstracted and indexed by the Science Citation Index. According to the Journal Citation Reports, its 2016 impact factor is 0.793, ranking it 24th out of 29 journals in the category "Mineralogy".
