= Gemstone =

Piece of mineral crystal used to make jewelry

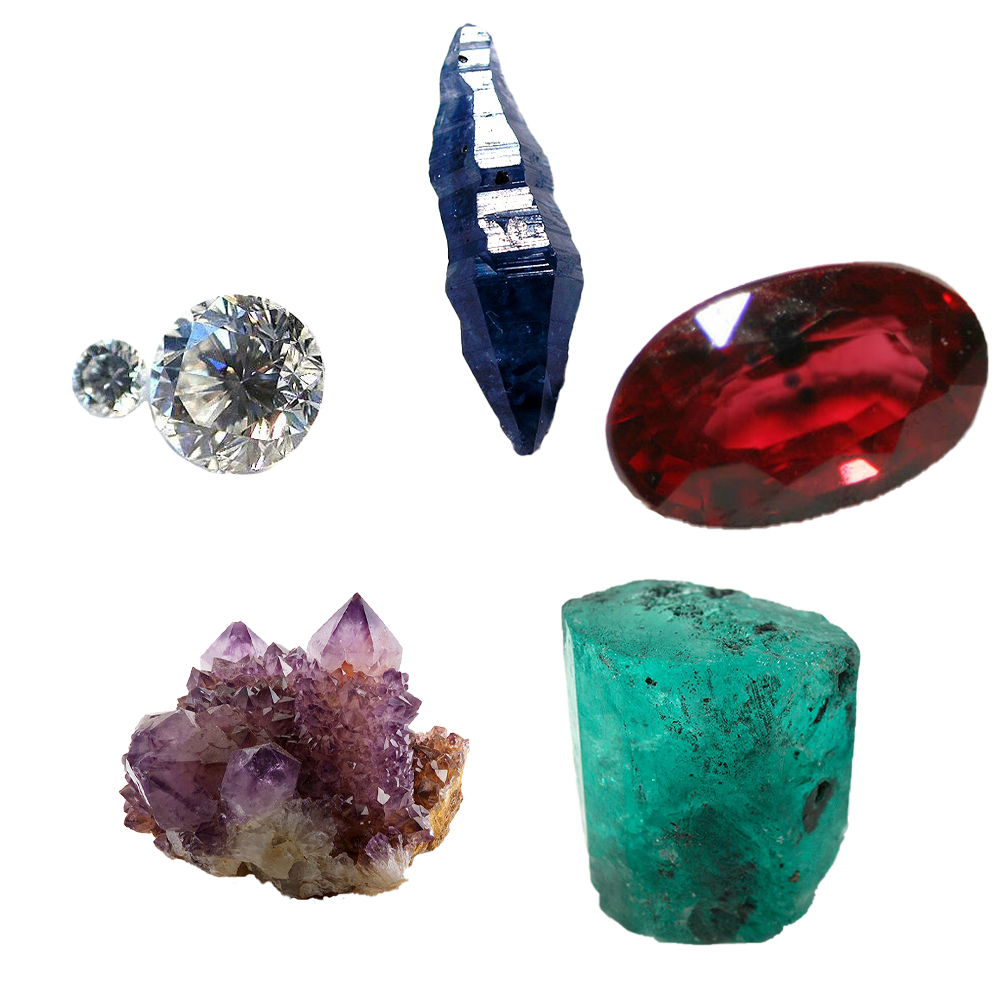
Group of precious and semiprecious stones—both uncut and faceted—including (clockwise from top left) diamond, uncut natural sapphire, ruby, uncut emerald, and amethyst crystal cluster.

A gemstone (also called a fine gem, jewel, precious stone, semiprecious stone, or simply gem) is a piece of mineral crystal which, when cut or polished, is used to make jewelry or other adornments. Certain rocks (such as lapis lazuli, opal, and obsidian) and occasionally organic materials that are not minerals (such as amber, jet, and pearl) may also be used for jewelry and are therefore often considered to be gemstones as well. Most gemstones are hard, but some softer minerals such as brazilianite may be used in jewelry because of their color, luster, or other physical properties that have aesthetic value. However, generally speaking, soft minerals are not typically used as gemstones by virtue of their brittleness and lack of durability.

Found all over the world, the industry of coloured gemstones (i.e. gemstones other than diamonds) is currently estimated at US$1.55 billion as of 2023 and is projected to steadily increase to a value of $4.46 billion by 2033.

A gem expert is a gemologist, a gem maker is called a lapidarist or gemcutter, and a diamond cutter is called a diamantaire.

== Characteristics and classification ==
Gemstones production

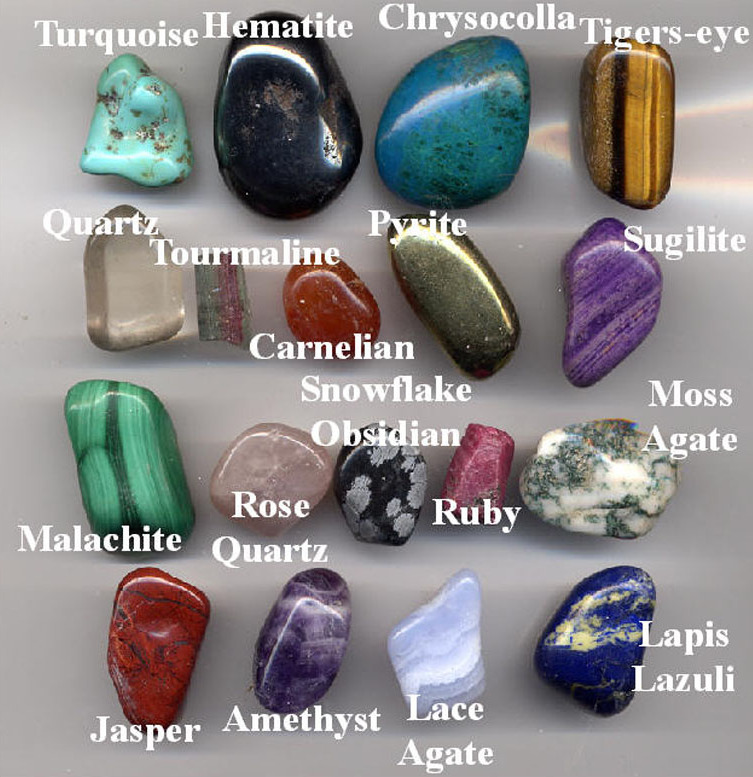
A collection of gemstone pebbles made by tumbling the rough stones, except the ruby and tourmaline, with abrasive grit inside a rotating barrel. The largest pebble here is 40 mm (1.6 in) long.

The traditional classification in the West, which goes back to the ancient Greeks, begins with a distinction between precious and semi-precious; similar distinctions are made in other cultures. In modern use, the precious stones are emerald, ruby, sapphire and diamond, with all other gemstones being semi-precious. This distinction reflects the rarity of the respective stones in ancient times, as well as their quality: all are translucent, with fine color in their purest forms (except for the colorless diamond), and very hard with a hardness score of 8 to 10 on the Mohs scale. Other stones are classified by their color, translucency, and hardness. The traditional distinction does not necessarily reflect modern values; for example, while most garnets are relatively inexpensive, a green garnet called tsavorite can be far more valuable than a mid-quality emerald. Another traditional term for semi-precious gemstones used in art history and archaeology is hardstone. The use of the terms "precious" and "semi-precious" in a commercial context is arguably misleading, as it suggests that certain stones are more valuable than others, which is not always reflected in their actual market value—although the terms may generally be accurate when referring to desirability.

In modern times gemstones are identified by gemologists, who describe gems and their characteristics using technical terminology specific to the field of gemology. The first characteristic a gemologist uses to identify a gemstone is its chemical composition. For example, diamonds are made of carbon (C), while sapphires and rubies are made of aluminium oxide (Al_{2}O_{3}). Many gems are crystals which are classified by their crystal system such as cubic or trigonal or monoclinic. Another term used is habit, the form the gem is usually found in. For example, diamonds, which have a cubic crystal system, are often found as octahedrons.

Gemstones are classified into different groups, species, and varieties. For example, ruby is the red variety of the species corundum, while any other color of corundum is considered sapphire. Other examples of beryl varieties include emerald (green), aquamarine (blue), red beryl (red), goshenite (colorless), heliodor (yellow), and morganite (pink).

Gems are characterized in terms of their color (hue, tone and saturation), optical phenomena, luster, refractive index, birefringence, dispersion, specific gravity, hardness, cleavage, and fracture. They may exhibit pleochroism or double refraction. They may have luminescence and a distinctive absorption spectrum. Gemstones may also be classified in terms of their "water". This is a recognized grading of the gem's luster, transparency, or "brilliance". Very transparent gems are considered "first water", while "second" or "third water" gems are those of a lesser transparency. Additionally, material or flaws within a stone may be present as inclusions.

== Value ==
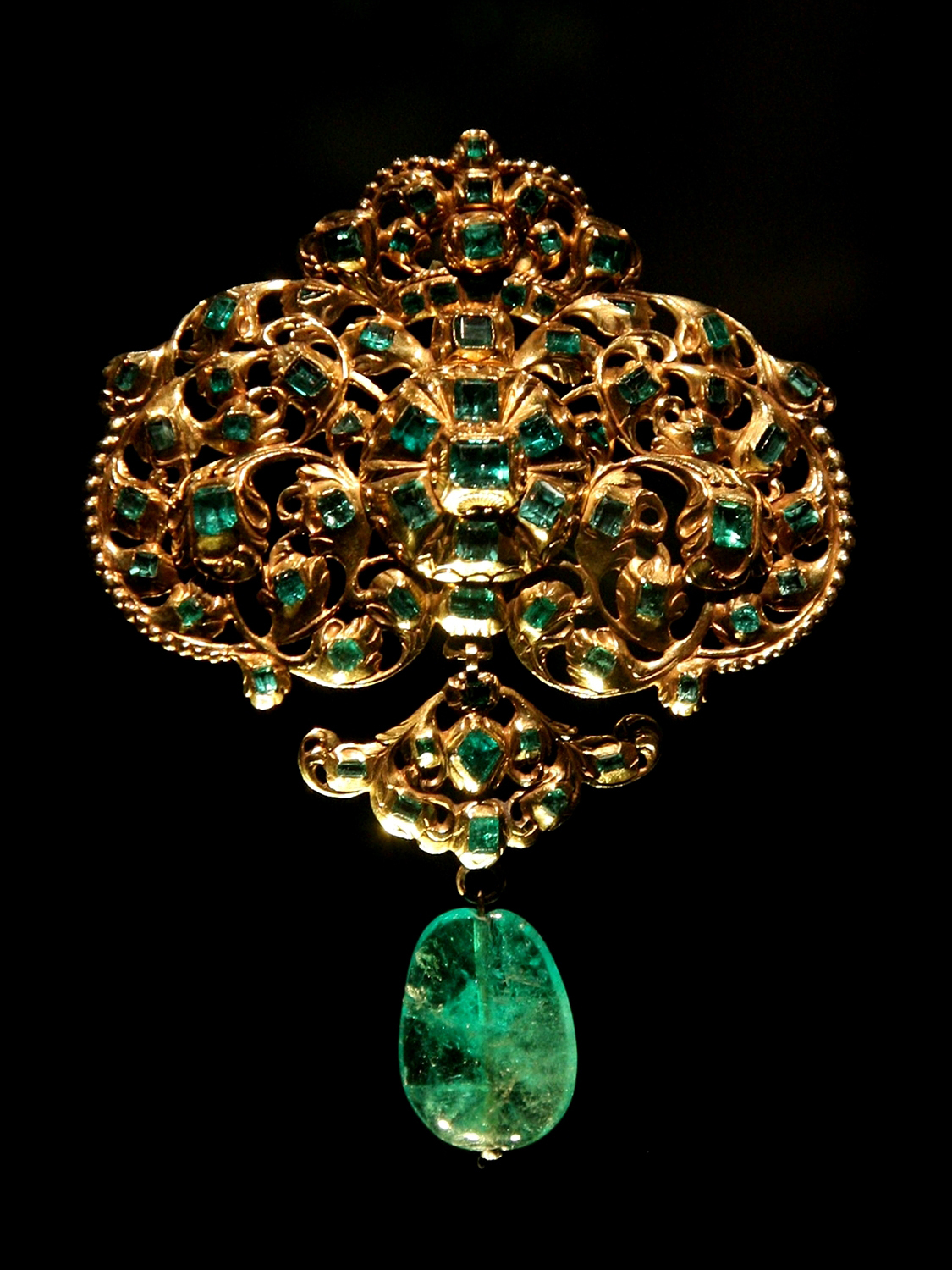
Spanish emerald and gold pendant at Victoria and Albert Museum

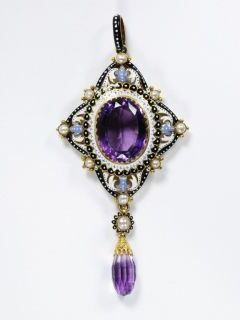
Enamelled gold, amethyst, and pearl pendant, about 1880, Pasquale Novissimo (1844–1914), V&A Museum number M.36-1928

Gemstones have no universally accepted grading system. Diamonds are graded using a system developed by the Gemological Institute of America (GIA) in the early 1950s. Historically, all gemstones were graded using the naked eye. The GIA system included a major innovation: the introduction of 10x magnification as the standard for grading clarity. Other gemstones are still graded using the naked eye (assuming 20/20 vision).

A mnemonic device, the "four Cs" (color, cut, clarity, and carats), has been introduced to help describe the factors used to grade a diamond. With modification, these categories can be useful in understanding the grading of all gemstones. The four criteria carry different weights depending upon whether they are applied to colored gemstones or to colorless diamonds. In diamonds, the cut is the primary determinant of value, followed by clarity and color. An ideally cut diamond will sparkle, to break down light into its constituent rainbow colors (dispersion), chop it up into bright little pieces (scintillation), and deliver it to the eye (brilliance). In its rough crystalline form, a diamond will do none of these things; it requires proper fashioning and this is called "cut". In gemstones that have color, including colored diamonds, the purity, and beauty of that color is the primary determinant of quality.

Physical characteristics that make a colored stone valuable are color, clarity to a lesser extent (emeralds will always have a number of inclusions), cut, unusual optical phenomena within the stone such as color zoning (the uneven distribution of coloring within a gem) and asteria (star effects).

Apart from the more generic and commonly used gemstones such as from diamonds, rubies, sapphires, and emeralds, pearls and opal have also been defined as precious in the jewellery trade. Up to the discoveries of bulk amethyst in Brazil in the 19th century, amethyst was considered a "precious stone" as well (as one of the cardinal gems), going back to ancient Greece. Even in the last century certain stones such as aquamarine, peridot and cat's eye (cymophane) have been popular and hence been regarded as precious, thus reinforcing the notion that a mineral's rarity may have been implicated in its classification as a precious stone and thus contribute to its value.

Today the gemstone trade no longer makes such a distinction. Many gemstones are used in even the most expensive jewelry, depending on the brand-name of the designer, fashion trends, market supply, treatments, etc. Nevertheless, diamonds, rubies, sapphires, and emeralds still have a reputation that exceeds those of other gemstones.

Rare or unusual gemstones, generally understood to include those gemstones which occur so infrequently in gem quality that they are scarcely known except to connoisseurs, include andalusite, axinite, cassiterite, clinohumite, painite and red beryl.

Gemstone pricing and value are governed by factors and characteristics in the quality of the stone. These characteristics include clarity, rarity, freedom from defects, the beauty of the stone, as well as the demand for such stones. There are different pricing influencers for both colored gemstones, and for diamonds. The pricing on colored stones is determined by market supply-and-demand, but diamonds are more intricate.

In the addition to the aesthetic and adorning/ornamental purpose of gemstones, there are proponents of energy medicine who also value gemstones on the basis of their alleged healing powers.

== Grading ==
There are a number of laboratories which grade and provide reports on gemstones.

- Gemological Institute of America (GIA), the main provider of education services and diamond grading reports
- International Gemological Institute (IGI), independent laboratory for grading and evaluation of diamonds, jewelry, and colored stones
- Hoge Raad Voor Diamant (HRD Antwerp), The Diamond High Council, Belgium is one of Europe's oldest laboratories; its main stakeholder is the Antwerp World Diamond Centre
- American Gemological Society (AGS) is not as widely recognized nor as old as the GIA
- American Gem Trade Laboratory which is part of the American Gem Trade Association (AGTA), a trade organization of jewelers and dealers of colored stones
- American Gemological Laboratories (AGL), owned by Christopher P. Smith
- European Gemological Laboratory (EGL), founded in 1974 by Guy Margel in Belgium
- Gemmological Association of All Japan (GAAJ-ZENHOKYO), Zenhokyo, Japan, active in gemological research
- The Gem and Jewelry Institute of Thailand (Public Organization) or GIT, Thailand's national institute for gemological research and gem testing, Bangkok
- Gemmology Institute of Southern Africa, Africa's premium gem laboratory
- Asian Institute of Gemological Sciences (AIGS), the oldest gemological institute in South East Asia, involved in gemological education and gem testing
- Swiss Gemmological Institute (SSEF), founded by Henry Hänni, focusing on colored gemstones and the identification of natural pearls
- Gübelin Gem Lab, the traditional Swiss lab founded by Eduard Gübelin

Each laboratory has its own methodology to evaluate gemstones. A stone can be called "pink" by one lab while another lab calls it "padparadscha". One lab can conclude a stone is untreated, while another lab might conclude that it is heat-treated. To minimize such differences, seven of the most respected labs, AGTA-GTL (New York), CISGEM (Milano), GAAJ-ZENHOKYO (Tokyo), GIA (Carlsbad), GIT (Bangkok), Gübelin (Lucerne) and SSEF (Basel), have established the Laboratory Manual Harmonisation Committee (LMHC), for the standardization of wording reports, promotion of certain analytical methods and interpretation of results. Country of origin has sometimes been difficult to determine, due to the constant discovery of new source locations. Determining a "country of origin" is thus much more difficult than determining other aspects of a gem (such as cut, clarity, etc.).

Gem dealers are aware of the differences between gem laboratories and will make use of the discrepancies to obtain the best possible certificate.

== Cutting and polishing ==
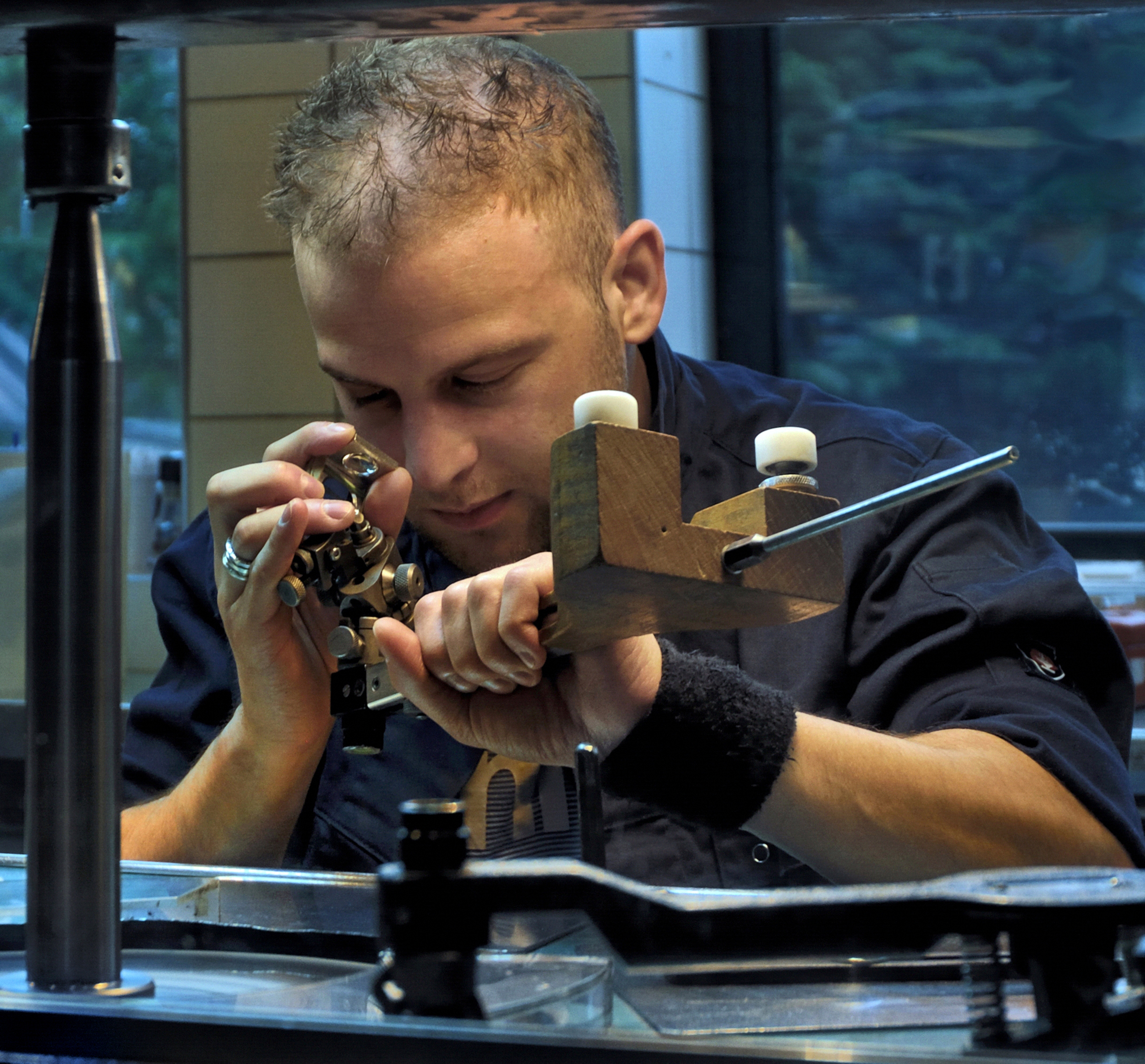
A diamond cutter in Amsterdam

A few gemstones are used as gems in the crystal or other forms in which they are found. Most, however, are cut and polished for usage as jewelry. The two main classifications are as follows:

- Stones cut as smooth, dome-shaped stones called cabochons or simply cab. These have been a popular shape since ancient time and are more durable than faceted gems.
- Stones which are cut with a faceting machine by polishing small flat windows called facets at regular intervals at exact angles.

Stones which are opaque or semi-opaque such as opal, turquoise, variscite, etc. are commonly cut as cabochons. These gems are designed to show the stone's color, luster and other surface properties as opposed to internal reflection properties like brilliance. Grinding wheels and polishing agents are used to grind, shape, and polish the smooth dome shape of the stones.

Gems that are transparent are normally faceted, a method that shows the optical properties of the stone's interior to its best advantage by maximizing reflected light which is perceived by the viewer as sparkle. There are many commonly used shapes for faceted stones. The facets must be cut at the proper angles, which vary depending on the optical properties of the gem. If the angles are too steep or too shallow, the light will pass through and not be reflected back toward the viewer. The faceting machine is used to hold the stone onto a flat lap for cutting and polishing the flat facets. Rarely, some cutters use special curved laps to cut and polish curved facets.

== Colors ==
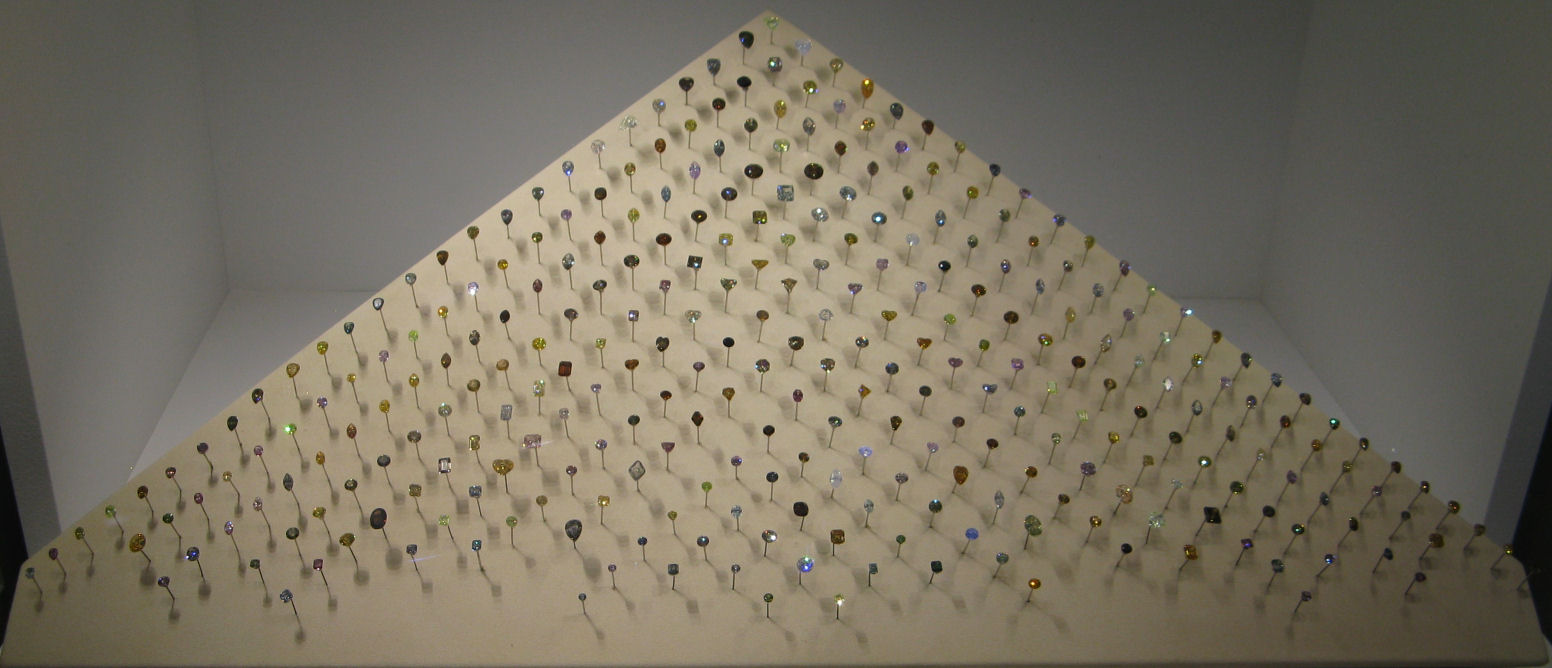
Nearly 300 variations of diamond color exhibited at the Aurora display at the Natural History Museum in London

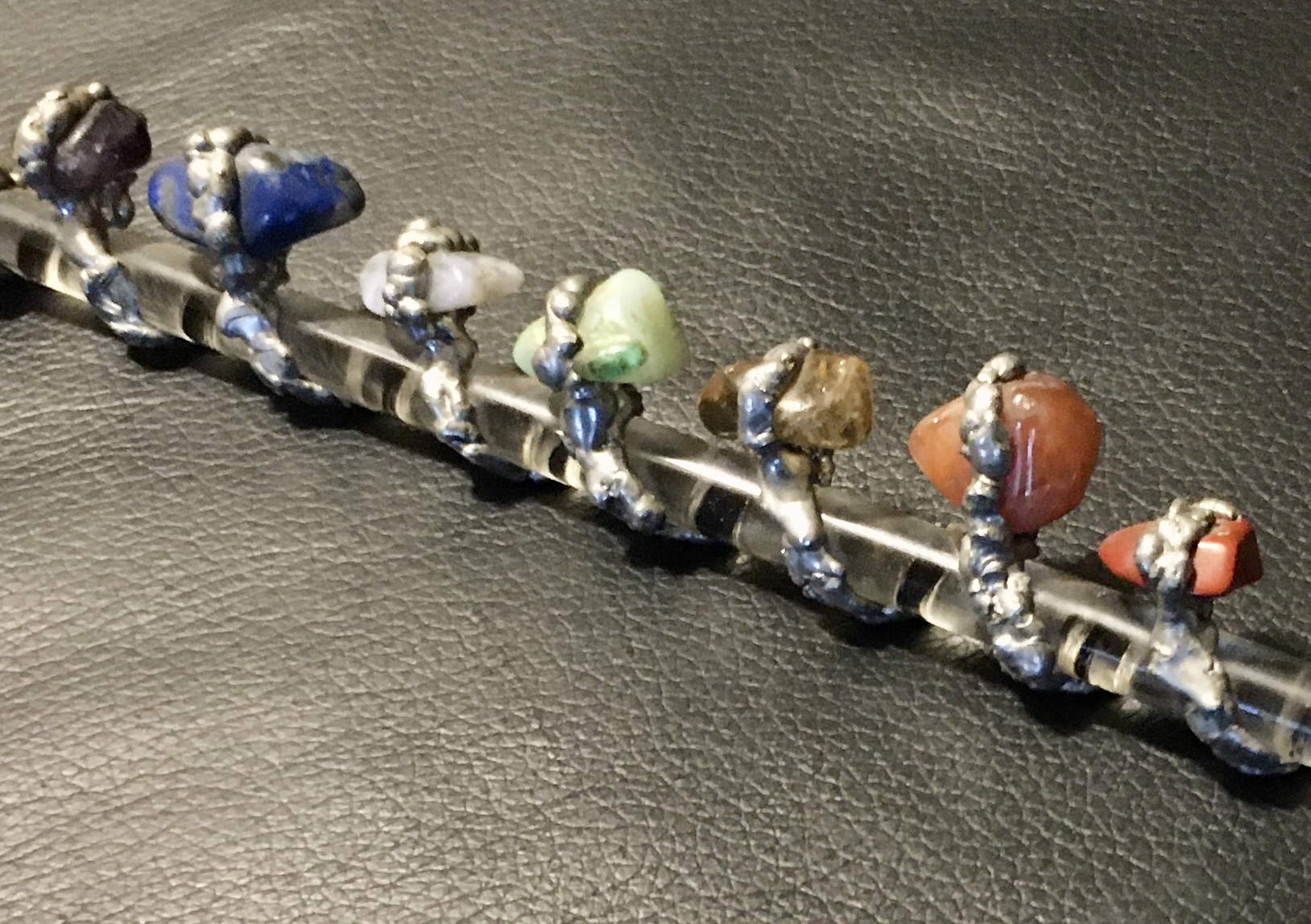
A variety of semiprecious stones in a piece of jewellery

The color of any material is due to the nature of light itself. Daylight, often called white light, is all of the colors of the spectrum combined. When light strikes a material, most of the light is absorbed while a smaller amount of a particular frequency or wavelength is reflected. The part that is reflected reaches the eye as the perceived color. A ruby appears red because it absorbs all other colors of white light while reflecting red.

A material which is mostly the same can exhibit different colors. For example, ruby and sapphire have the same primary chemical composition (both are corundum) but exhibit different colors because of impurities which absorb and reflect different wavelengths of light depending on their individual compositions. Even the same named gemstone can occur in many different colors: sapphires show different shades of blue and pink and "fancy sapphires" exhibit a whole range of other colors from yellow to orange-pink, the latter called "padparadscha sapphire".

This difference in color is based on the atomic structure of the stone. Although the different stones formally have the same chemical composition and structure, they are not exactly the same. Every now and then an atom is replaced by a completely different atom, sometimes as few as one in a million atoms. These so-called impurities are sufficient to absorb certain colors and leave the other colors unaffected. For example, beryl, which is colorless in its pure mineral form, becomes emerald with chromium impurities. If manganese is added instead of chromium, beryl becomes pink morganite. With iron, it becomes aquamarine. Some gemstone treatments make use of the fact that these impurities can be "manipulated", thus changing the color of the gem.

== Treatment ==
Gemstones are often treated to enhance the color or clarity of the stone. In some cases, the treatment applied to the gemstone can also increase its durability. Even though natural gemstones can be transformed using the traditional method of cutting and polishing, other treatment options allow the stone's appearance to be enhanced. Depending on the type and extent of treatment, they can affect the value of the stone. Some treatments are used widely because the resulting gem is stable, while others are not accepted most commonly because the gem color is unstable and may revert to the original tone.

=== Early history ===
Before modern-day tools, thousands of years ago, a variety of techniques were used to treat and enhance gemstones. Some of the earliest methods of gemstone treatment date back to the Minoan Age, for example foiling, in which metal foil is used to enhance a gemstone's colour. Other methods recorded 2000 years ago in the book Natural History by Pliny the Elder include oiling and dyeing/staining.

=== Heat ===
Heat can either improve or spoil gemstone color or clarity. The heating process has been well known to gem miners and cutters for centuries, and in many stone types heating is a common practice. Most citrine is made by heating amethyst, and partial heating with a strong gradient results in "ametrine" – a stone partly amethyst and partly citrine. Aquamarine is often heated to remove yellow tones, or to change green colors into the more desirable blue, or enhance its existing blue color to a deeper blue.

Nearly all tanzanite is heated at low temperatures to remove brown undertones and give a more desirable blue / purple color. A considerable portion of all sapphire and ruby is treated with a variety of heat treatments to improve both color and clarity.

When jewelry containing diamonds is heated for repairs, the diamond should be protected with boric acid; otherwise, the diamond, which is pure carbon, could be burned on the surface or even burned completely up. When jewelry containing sapphires or rubies is heated, those stones should not be coated with boric acid (which can etch the surface) or any other substance. They do not have to be protected from burning, like a diamond (although the stones do need to be protected from heat stress fracture by immersing the part of the jewelry with stones in the water when metal parts are heated).

=== Radiation ===
The irradiation process is widely used in the jewelry industry and enables the creation of gemstone colors that do not exist or are extremely rare in nature. However, particularly when done in a nuclear reactor, the processes can make gemstones radioactive. Health risks related to the residual radioactivity of the treated gemstones have led to government regulations in many countries.

Virtually all blue topaz, both the lighter and the darker blue shades such as "London" blue, has been irradiated to change the color from white to blue. Most green quartz (Oro Verde) are also irradiated to achieve the yellow-green color. Diamonds are mainly irradiated to become blue-green or green, although other colors are possible. When light-to-medium-yellow diamonds are treated with gamma rays they may become green; with a high-energy electron beam, blue.

=== Waxing/oiling ===
Emeralds containing natural fissures are sometimes filled with wax or oil to disguise them. This wax or oil is also colored to make the emerald appear of better color as well as clarity. Turquoise is also commonly treated in a similar manner.

=== Fracture filling ===
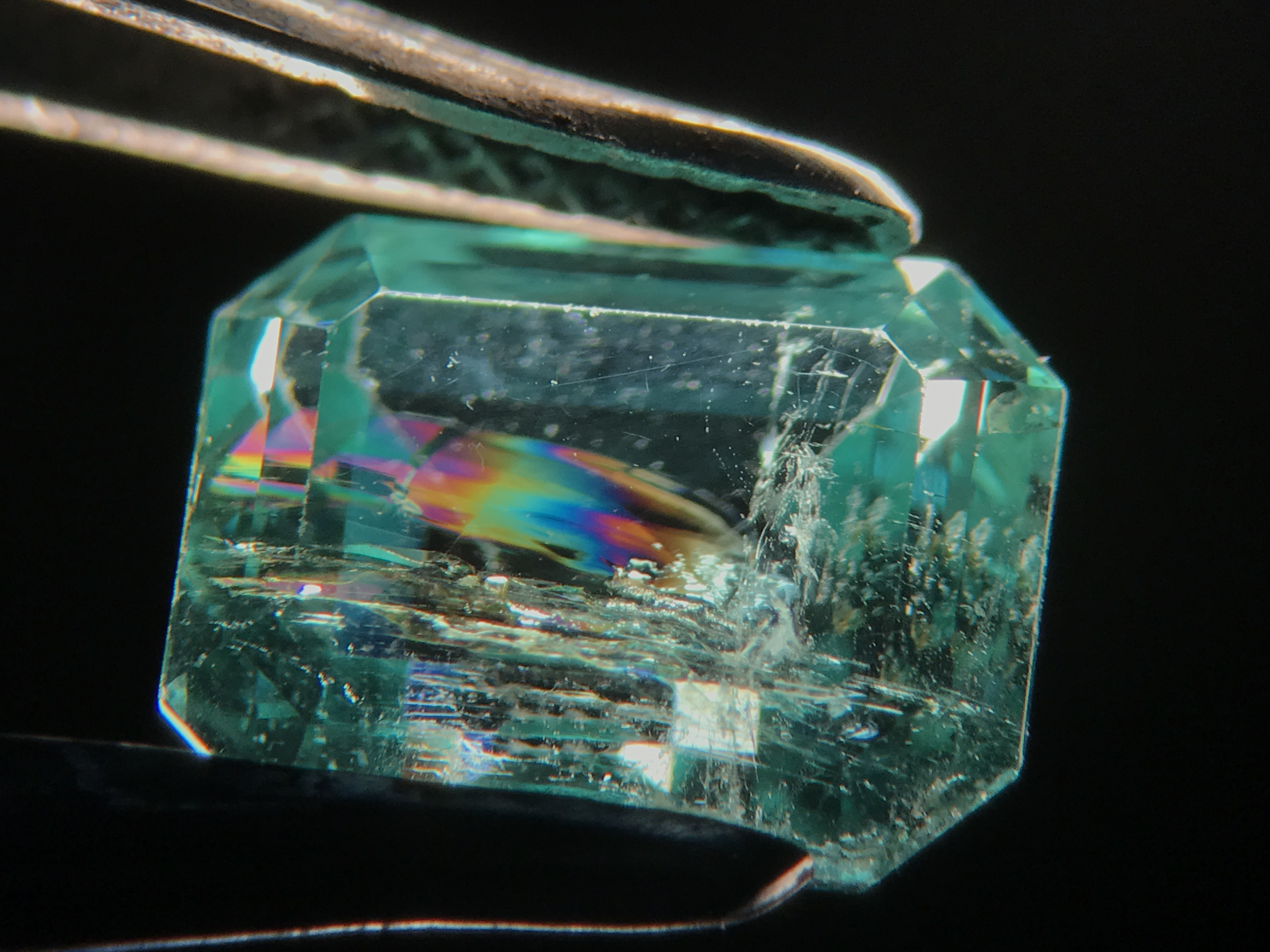
The foreign material inside this fracture-filled emerald appears rainbow-colored under darkfield illumination.

Fracture filling has been in use with different gemstones such as diamonds, emeralds, and sapphires. In 2006 "glass-filled rubies" received publicity. Rubies over 10 carats (2 g) with large fractures were filled with lead glass, thus dramatically improving the appearance (of larger rubies in particular). Such treatments are fairly easy to detect.

=== Bleaching ===
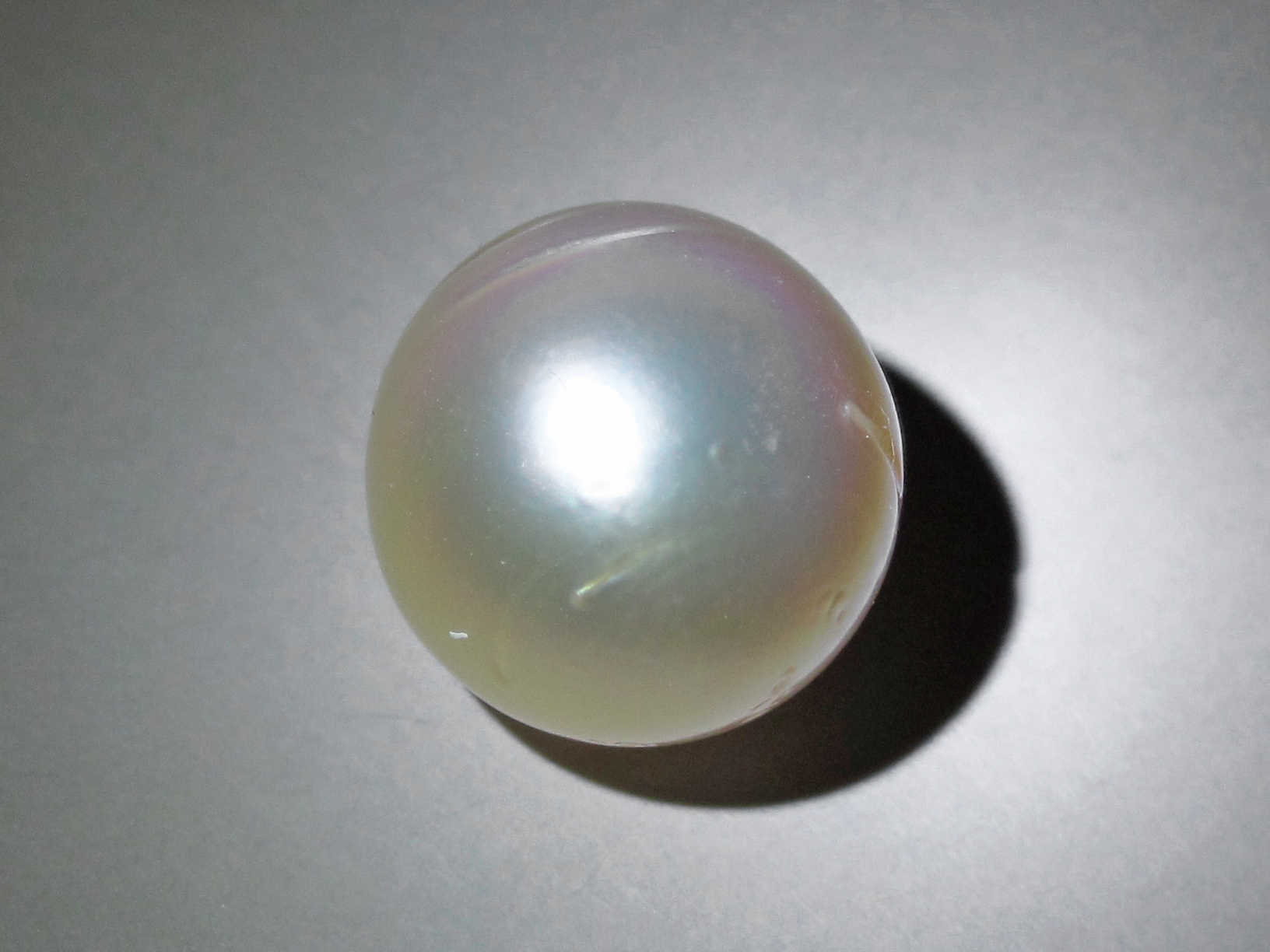
Pearls are a gemstone that is commonly treated with hydrogen peroxide to remove unwanted colours.

Another treatment method that is commonly used to treat gemstones is bleaching. This method uses a chemical in order to reduce the colour of the gem. After bleaching, a combination treatment can be done by dying the gemstone once the unwanted colours are removed. Hydrogen peroxide is the most commonly used product used to alter gemstones and have notably been used to treat jade and pearls. The treatment of bleaching can also be followed by impregnation, which allows the gemstone's durability to be increased.

== Socioeconomic issues ==
The socio-economic dynamics of the gemstone industry are shaped by market forces and consumer preferences and typically go undiscussed. Changes in demand and prices can significantly affect the livelihoods of those involved in gemstone mining and trade, particularly in developing countries where the industry serves as a crucial source of income.

A situation that arises as a result of this is the exploitation of natural resources and labor within gemstone mining operations. Many mines, particularly in developing countries, face challenges such as inadequate safety measures, low wages, and poor working conditions. Miners, often from disadvantaged backgrounds, endure hazardous working conditions and receive meager wages, contributing to cycles of poverty and exploitation. Gemstone mining operations are frequently conducted in remote or underdeveloped areas, lacking proper infrastructure and access to essential services such as healthcare and education. This further contributes to the pre-existing socio-economic disparities and obstructs community development such that the benefits of gemstone extraction may not adequately reach those directly involved in the process.

Another such issue revolves around environmental degradation resulting from mining activities. Environmental degradation can pose long-term threats to ecosystems and biodiversity, further worsening the socio-economic state in affected regions. Unregulated mining practices often result in deforestation, soil erosion, and water contamination thus threatening ecosystems and biodiversity. Unregulated mining activity can also cause depletion of natural resources, thus diminishing the prospects for sustainable development. The environmental impact of gemstone mining not only poses a threat to ecosystems but also undermines the long-term viability of the industry by diminishing the quality and quantity of available resources.

Furthermore, the gemstone industry is also susceptible to issues related to transparency and ethics, which impact both producers and consumers. The lack of standardized certification processes and the prevalence of illicit practices undermine market integrity and trust. The lack of transparency and accountability in the supply chain aggravates pre-existing inequalities, as middlemen and corporations often capture a disproportionate share of the profits. As a result, the unequal distribution of profits along the supply chain does little to improve socio-economic inequalities, particularly in regions where gemstones are mined.

Addressing these socio-economic challenges requires intensive effort from various stakeholders, including governments, industry executives, and society, to promote sustainable practices and ensure equitable outcomes for all involved parties. Implementing and enforcing regulations to ensure fair labor practices, environmental sustainability, and ethical sourcing is essential. Additionally, investing in community development projects, such as education and healthcare initiatives, can help alleviate poverty and empower marginalized communities dependent on the gemstone industry. Collaboration across sectors is crucial for fostering a more equitable and sustainable gemstone trade that benefits both producers and consumers while respecting human rights and environmental integrity.

== Synthetic and artificial gemstones ==
Synthetic gemstones are distinct from imitation or simulated gems.

Synthetic gems are physically, optically, and chemically identical to the natural stone, but are created in a laboratory. Imitation or simulated stones are chemically different from the natural stone, but may appear quite similar to it; they can be more easily manufactured synthetic gemstones of a different mineral (spinel), glass, plastic, resins, or other compounds.

Examples of simulated or imitation stones include cubic zirconia, composed of zirconium oxide, synthetic moissanite, and uncolored, synthetic corundum or spinels; all of which are diamond simulants. The simulants imitate the look and color of the real stone but possess neither their chemical nor physical characteristics. In general, all are less hard than diamond. Moissanite actually has a higher refractive index than diamond, and when presented beside an equivalently sized and cut diamond will show more "fire".

Cultured, synthetic, or "lab-created" gemstones are not imitations: The bulk mineral and trace coloring elements are the same in both. For example, diamonds, rubies, sapphires, and emeralds have been manufactured in labs that possess chemical and physical characteristics identical to the naturally occurring variety. Synthetic (lab created) corundum, including ruby and sapphire, is very common and costs much less than the natural stones. Small synthetic diamonds have been manufactured in large quantities as industrial abrasives, although larger gem-quality synthetic diamonds are becoming available in multiple carats.

Whether a gemstone is a natural stone or synthetic, the chemical, physical, and optical characteristics are the same: They are composed of the same mineral and are colored by the same trace materials, have the same hardness and density and strength, and show the same color spectrum, refractive index, and birefringence (if any). Lab-created stones tend to have a more vivid color since impurities common in natural stones are not present in the synthetic stone. Synthetics are made free of common naturally occurring impurities that reduce gem clarity or color unless intentionally added in order to provide a more drab, natural appearance, or to deceive an assayer. On the other hand, synthetics often show flaws not seen in natural stones, such as minute particles of corroded metal from lab trays used during synthesis.

=== Types ===
Some gemstones are more difficult to synthesize than others and not all stones are commercially viable to attempt to synthesize. These are the most common on the market currently.

==== Synthetic corundum ====
Synthetic corundum includes ruby (red variation) and sapphire (other color variations), both of which are considered highly desired and valued. Ruby was the first gemstone to be synthesized by Auguste Verneuil with his development of the flame-fusion process in 1902. Synthetic corundum continues to be made typically by flame-fusion as it is most cost-effective, but can also be produced through flux growth and hydrothermal growth.

==== Synthetic beryls ====
The most common synthesized beryl is emerald (green). Yellow, red and blue beryls are possible but much more rare. Synthetic emerald became possible with the development of the flux growth process and is produced in this way and well as hydrothermal growth.

==== Synthetic quartz ====
Types of synthetic quartz include citrine, rose quartz, and amethyst. Natural occurring quartz is not rare, but is nevertheless synthetically produced as it has practical application outside of aesthetic purposes. Quartz generates an electric current when under pressure and is used in watches, clocks, and oscillators.

==== Synthetic spinel ====
Synthetic spinel was first produced by accident. It can be created in any color making it popular to simulate various natural gemstones. It is created through flux growth and hydrothermal growth.

=== Creation process ===
There are two main categories for creation of these minerals: melt or solution processes.

==== Verneuil flame fusion process (melt process) ====
Verneuil furnace

The flame fusion process was the first process used which successfully created large quantities of synthetic gemstones to be sold on the market. This remains the most cost effective and common method of creating corundums today.

The flame fusion process is completed in a Verneuil furnace. The furnace consists of an inverted blowpipe burner which produces an extremely hot oxyhydrogen flame, a powder dispenser, and a ceramic pedestal. A chemical powder which corresponds to the desired gemstone is passed through this flame. This melts the ingredients which drop on to a plate and solidify into a crystal called a boule. For corundum the flame must be 2000 °C. This process takes hours and yields a crystal with the same properties as its natural counterpart.

To produce corundum, a pure aluminium powder is used with different additives to achieve different colors.

- Chromic oxide for ruby
- Iron and titanium oxide for blue sapphire
- Nickel oxide for yellow sapphire
- Nickel, chromium and iron for orange sapphire
- Manganese for pink sapphire
- Copper for blue-green sapphire
- Cobalt for dark blue sapphire

==== Czochralski process (melt process) ====
In 1918 the Czochralski process was developed by Jan Czochralski. It is also referred to as the "crystal pulling" method. In this process, the required gemstone materials are added to a crucible. A seed stone is placed into the melt in the crucible. As the gem begins to crystallize on the seed, the seed is pulled away and the gem continues to grow. This is used for corundum but is currently the least popular method.

==== Flux growth (solution process) ====
The flux growth process was the first process able to synthesize emerald. Flux growth begins with a crucible which can withstand high heat; either graphite or platinum which is filled with a molten liquid referred to as flux. The specific gem ingredients are added and dissolved in this fluid and recrystallize to form the desired gemstone. This is a longer process compared to the flame fusion process and can take two months up to a year depending on the desired final size.

==== Hydrothermal growth (solution process) ====
The hydrothermal growth process attempts to imitate the natural growth process of minerals. The required gem materials are sealed in a container of water and placed under extreme pressure. The water is heated beyond its boiling point which allows normally insoluble materials to dissolve. As more material cannot be added once the container is sealed, in order to create a larger gem the process would begin with a "seed" stone from a previous batch which the new material will crystallize on. This process takes a few weeks to complete.

=== Characteristics ===
Synthetic gemstones share chemical and physical properties with natural gemstones, but there are some slight differences that can be used to discern synthetic from natural. These differences are slight and often require microscopy as a tool to distinguish differences. Undetectable synthetics pose a threat to the market if they are able to be sold as rare natural gemstones. Because of this there are certain characteristic gemologists look for. Each crystal is characteristic to the environment and growth process under which it was created.

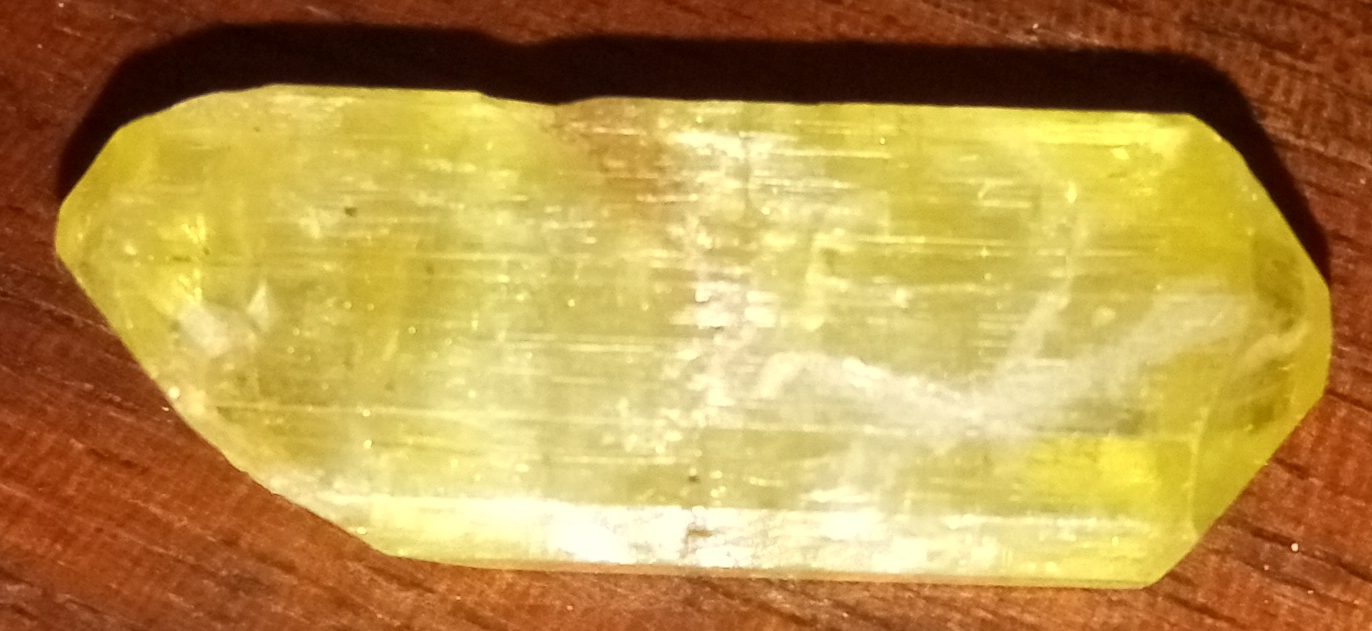
Visible banding in an apatite gemstone

Gemstones created from the flame-fusion process may have

- small air bubbles which were trapped inside the boule during formation process
- visible banding from formation of the boule
- chatter marks on the surface which may appear crack-like, caused by damage during polishing of the gemstone

Gemstones created from flux melt process may have

- small cavities which are filled with flux solution
- inclusions in the gemstone from crucible used

Gemstones created from hydrothermal growth may have

- inclusions from container used

=== History ===
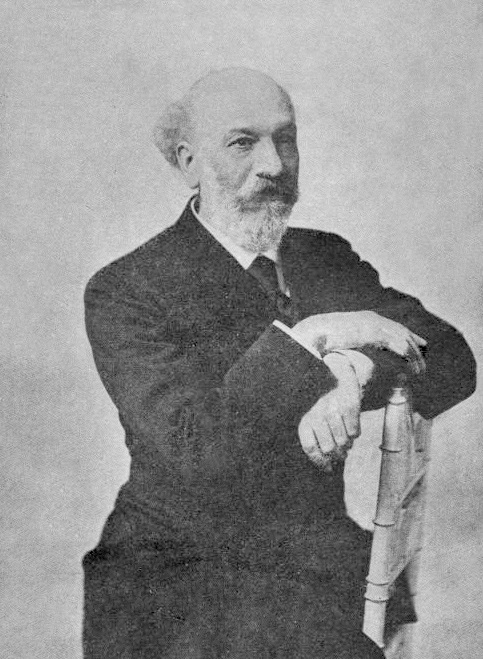
Auguste Verneuil – creator of flame-fusion process 1902

Prior to development of synthesising processes the alternatives on the market to natural gemstones were imitations or fake. In 1837, the first successful synthesis of ruby occurred. French chemist Marc Gaudin managed to produce small crystals of ruby from melting together potassium aluminium sulphate and potassium chromate through what would later be known as the flux melt process. Following this, another French chemist Fremy was able to grow large quantities of small ruby crystals using a lead flux.

A few years later an alternative to flux melt was developed which led to the introduction of what was labeled "reconstructed ruby" to the market. Reconstructed ruby was sold as a process which produced larger rubies from melting together bits of natural ruby. In later attempts to recreate this process it was found to not be possible and is believed reconstructed rubies were most likely created using a multi-step method of melting of ruby powder.

Auguste Verneuil, a student of Fremy, went on to develop flame-fusion as an alternative to the flux-melt method. He developed large furnaces which were able to produce large quantities of corundums more efficiently and shifted the gemstone market dramatically. This process is still used today and the furnaces have not changed much from the original design. World production of corundum using this method reaches 1000 million carats a year.

== List of rare gemstones ==
- Painite was discovered in 1956 in Ohngaing in Myanmar. The mineral was named in honor of the British gemologist Arthur Charles Davy Pain. At one point it was considered the rarest mineral on Earth.
- Tanzanite was discovered in 1967 in Northern Tanzania. With its supply possibly declining in the next 30 years, this gemstone is considered to be more rare than a diamond. This type of gemstone receives its vibrant blue from being heated.
- Hibonite was discovered in 1956 in Madagascar. It was named after the discoverer, French geologist Paul Hibon. Gem quality hibonite has been found only in Myanmar.

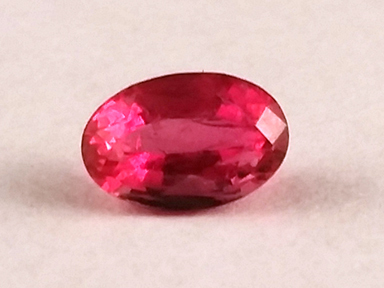
Red Beryl – discovered in 1904

- Red beryl or bixbite was discovered in an area near Beaver, Utah in 1904 and named after the American mineralogist Maynard Bixby.
- Jeremejevite was discovered in 1883 in Russia and named after its discoverer, Pawel Wladimirowich Jeremejew (1830–1899).
- Chambersite was discovered in 1957 in Chambers County, Texas, US, and named after the deposit's location.
- Taaffeite was discovered in 1945. It was named after the discoverer, the Irish gemologist Count Edward Charles Richard Taaffe.
- Musgravite was discovered in 1967 in the Musgrave Mountains in South Australia and named for the location.

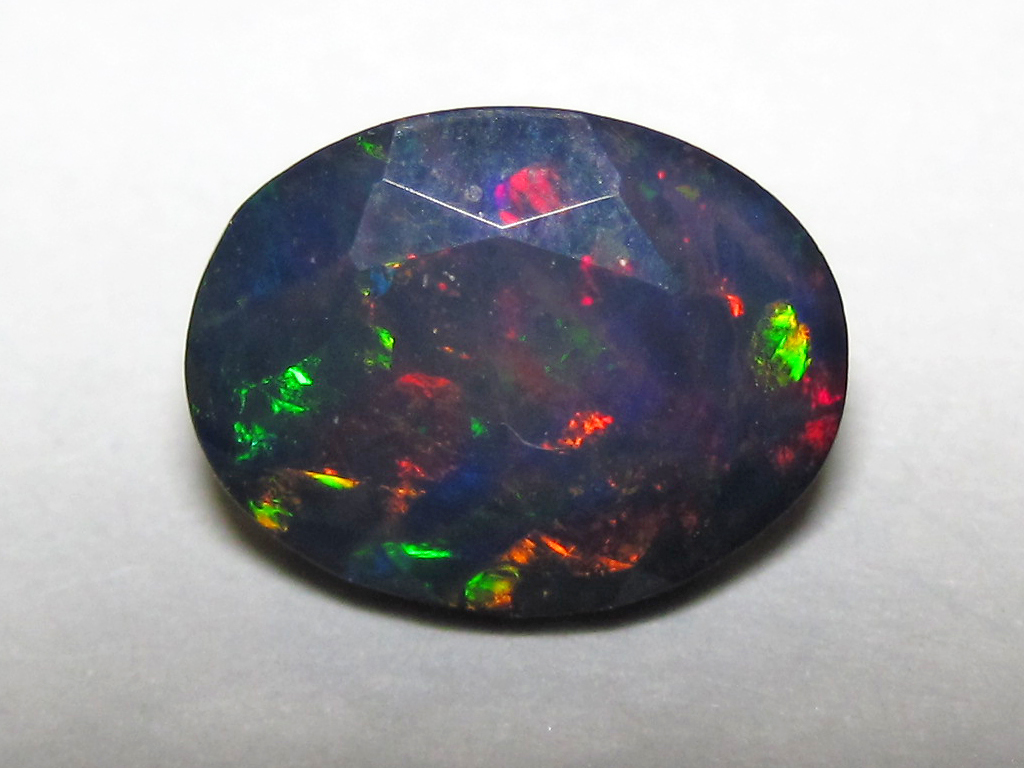
Black Opal – the rarest type of opal

- Black opal is directly mined in New South Wales, Australia, making it the rarest type of opal. Having a darker composition, this gemstone can be in a variety of colours.
- Grandidierite was discovered by Antoine François Alfred Lacroix (1863–1948) in 1902 in Tuléar Province, Madagascar. It was named in honor of the French naturalist and explorer Alfred Grandidier (1836–1912).
- Poudretteite was discovered in 1965 at the Poudrette Quarry in Canada and named after the quarry's owners and operators, the Poudrette family.
- Serendibite was discovered in Sri Lanka by Sunil Palitha Gunasekera in 1902 and named after Serendib, the old Arabic name for Sri Lanka.
- Zektzerite was discovered by Bart Cannon in 1968 on Kangaroo Ridge near Washington Pass in Okanogan County, Washington, USA. The mineral was named in honor of mathematician and geologist Jack Zektzer, who presented the material for study in 1976.
- Kyawthuite was discovered in the vicinity of Mogok in Myanmar, The only known sample of kyawthuite is on display at the Natural History Museum of Los Angeles County.

== See also ==
- Assembled gem
- Gemology
- List of gemstones by species
- List of individual gemstones
- List of names derived from gemstones
- List of emeralds by size
- List of sapphires by size
- List of diamonds
- Luminous gemstones
- Birthstone
