= Topaz Mountain =

Mountain in Juab County, Utah, USA

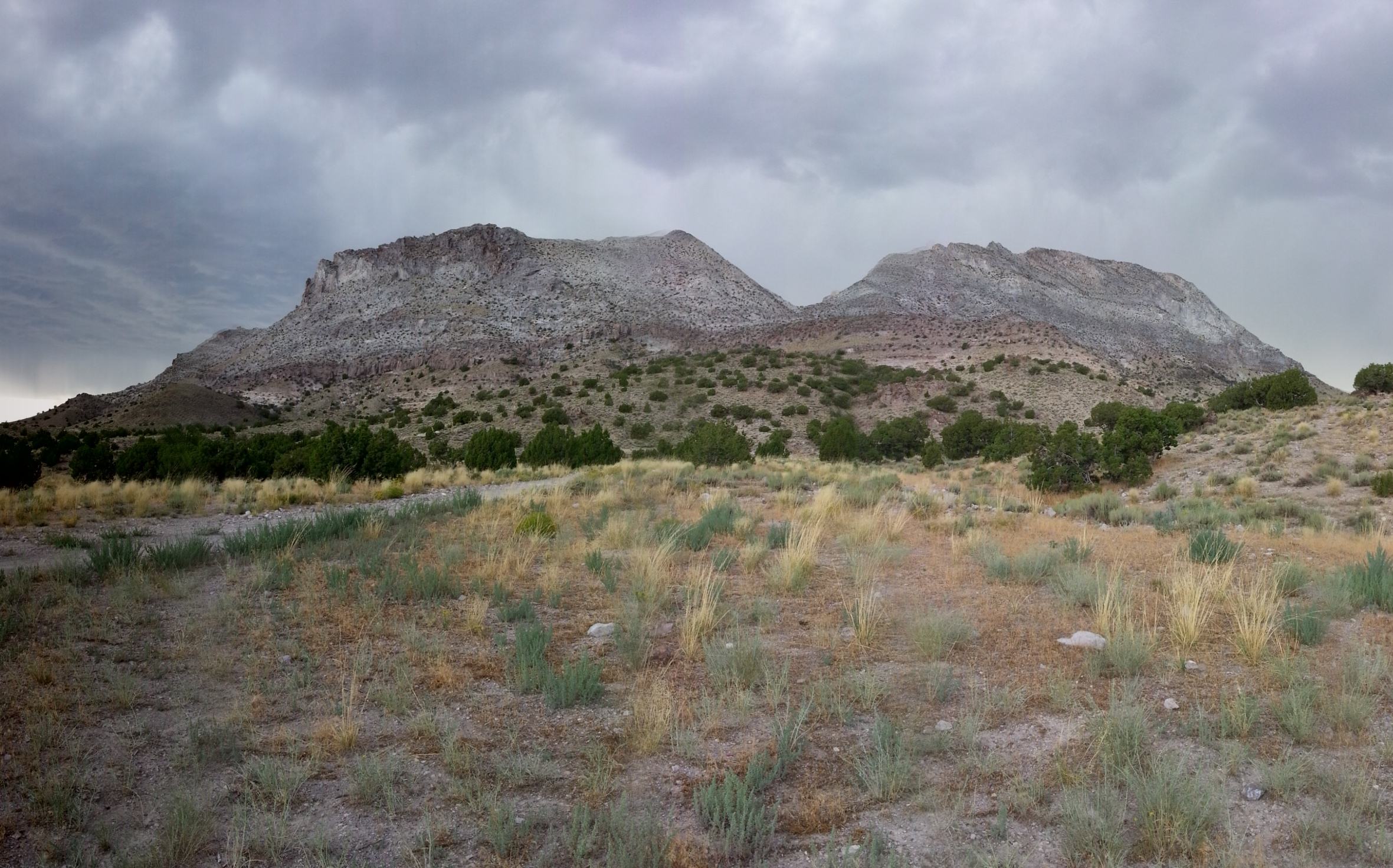
- Topaz Mountain from the east

Highest point
- Elevation: 7,052 ft (2,149 m) NAVD 88
- Prominence: 706 ft (215 m)
- Coordinates: 39°42′34″N 113°06′21″W

Geography
- Location within Utah Location within the United States
- Location: Juab County, Utah, U.S.
- Parent range: Thomas Range
- Topo map: USGS Topaz Mountain East

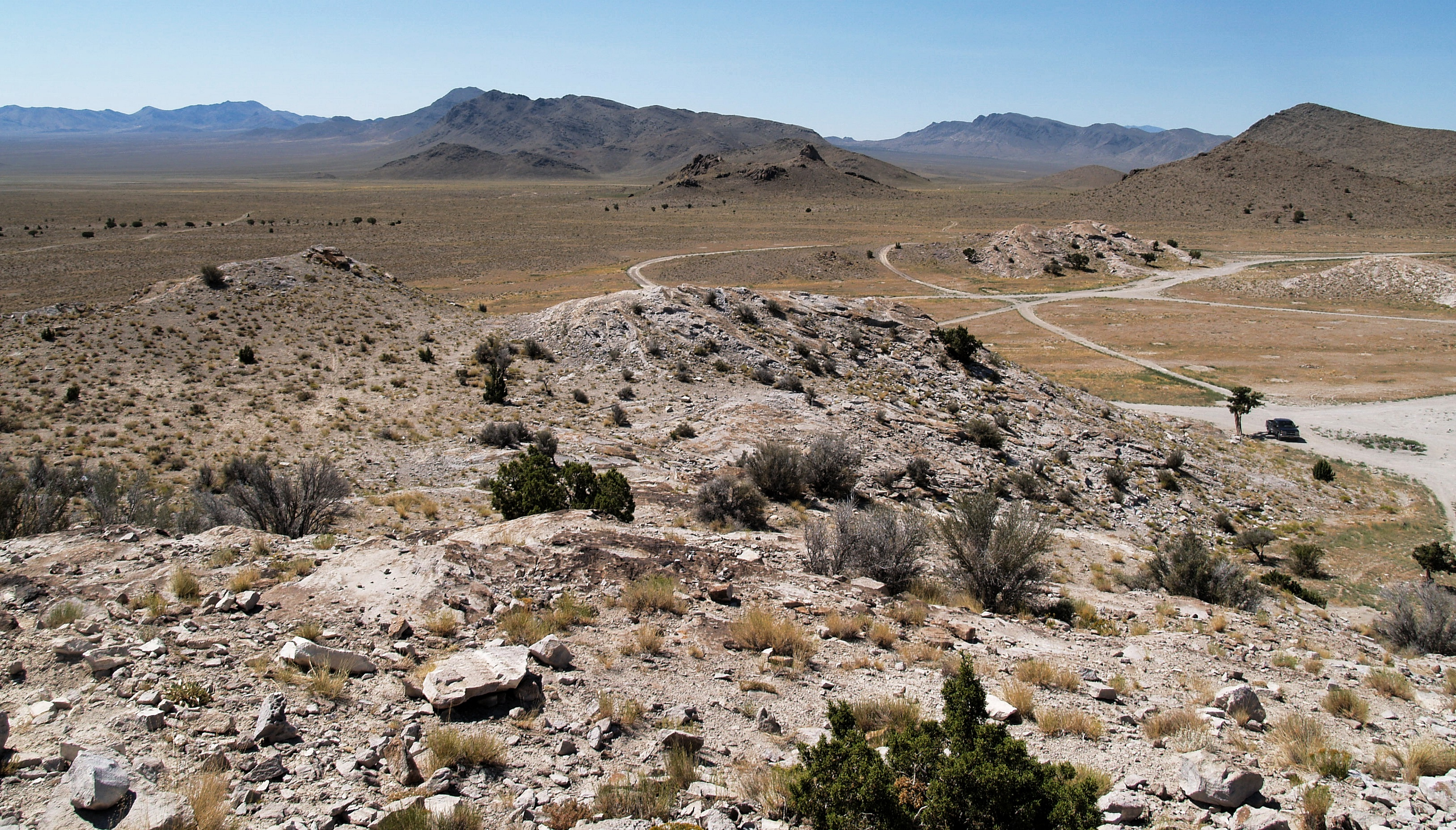
The ground around Topaz Mountain

Topaz Mountain is a summit in the Thomas Range of Utah, east of the Thomas caldera. The summit and surrounding area are known for their abundances of semiprecious minerals including topaz, red beryl and opal.

== Geology and geography ==
Topaz Mountain is part of the Thomas Range in Juab County, Utah, approximately 36 miles Northwest of Delta, Utah. It lies on publicly owned land managed by the Bureau of Land Management (BLM). Collection of rocks and mineral is permitted there and, as a result, the area is frequented by amateur and professional rock hounds.

Red beryl in topaz-bearing rhyolite, and water-laid rhyolitic tuff, was known on Topaz Mountain since 1905. This Tertiary age tuff is found throughout the Thomas Range. In 1959, beryllium deposits (bertrandite) were found overlying this tuff on Spor Mountain.

== Minerals ==
=== Topaz ===
Topaz is a semiprecious gemstone that occurs as very hard, transparent crystals in a variety of colors. It is naturally amber-colored, but becomes colorless after exposure to sunlight. Topaz forms within cavities of the volcanic rock rhyolite, from eruptions that occurred during the Tertiary Period six to seven million years ago. Topaz is embedded in the rhyolite rock, and also found loose on the slopes and arroyos.

=== Red beryl ===
Red beryl, a rare mineral found at Topaz Mountain, occurs as small crystals, often attached to other mineral crystals. It is estimated that one red beryl crystal is found for every 150,000 diamonds. Prices for top quality natural red beryl can be as high as $10,000 per carat for faceted stones.

=== Other minerals ===
A variety of other minerals are found at Topaz Mountain including garnet, amethyst, bixbyite, opal, pseudobrookite and hematite.
