= Pezzottaite =

Mineral species

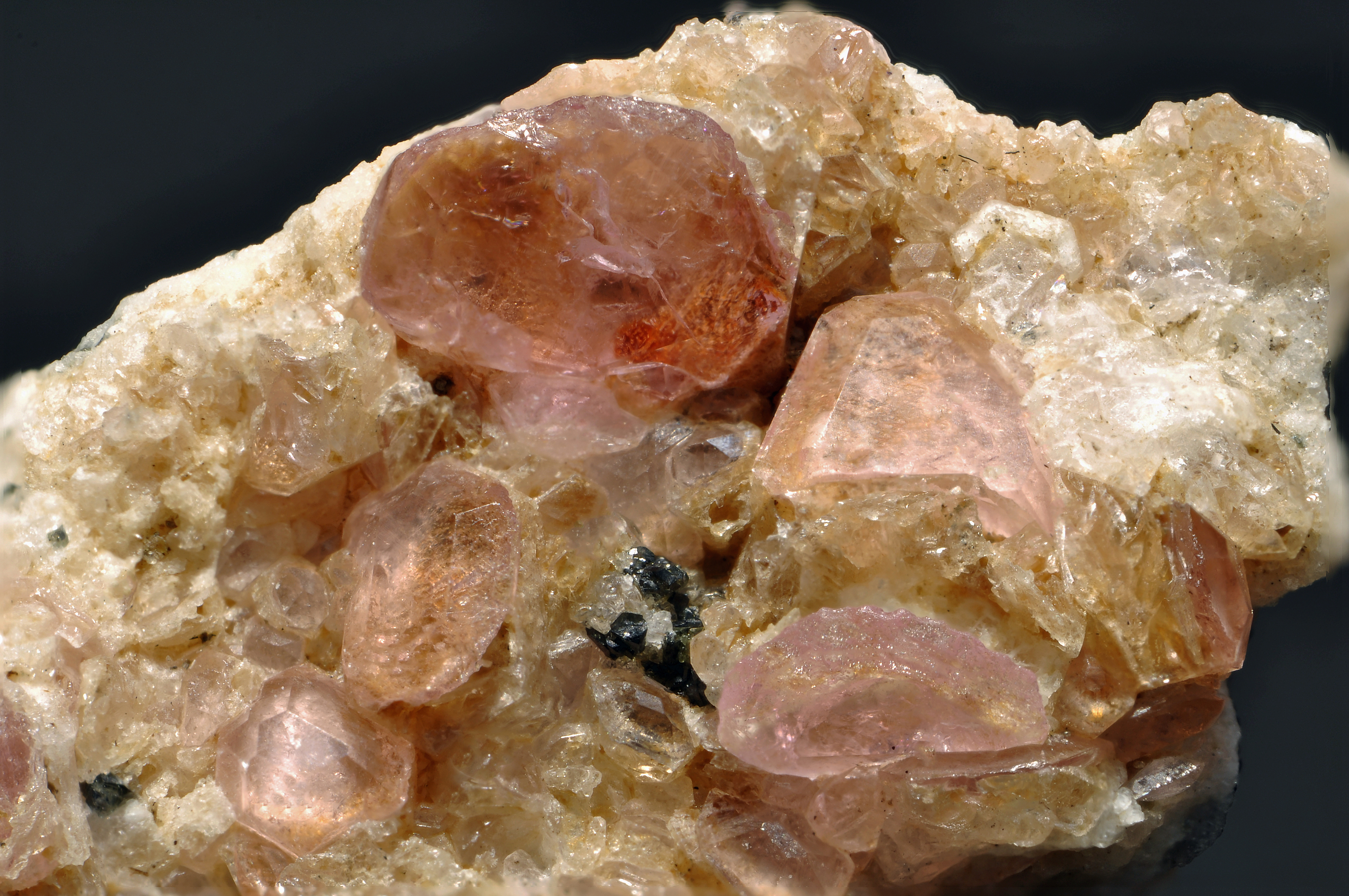

General
- Category: Cyclosilicate minerals
- Formula: Cs(Be_{2}Li)Al_{2}Si_{6}O_{18}
- IMA symbol: Pez
- Crystal system: Trigonal
- Crystal class: Ditrigonal pyramidal (3m) (same H-M symbol)
- Space group: R3c

Identification
- Color: Raspberry red, orange-red, pink
- Crystal habit: Flattened, tabular, equant, aggregate
- Cleavage: Imperfect; basal
- Fracture: Conchoidal to uneven
- Tenacity: Brittle
- Mohs scale hardness: 8
- Luster: Vitreous
- Streak: White
- Specific gravity: 3.10
- Optical properties: Uniaxial
- Refractive index: 1.601 to 1.620
- Birefringence: −0.008 to 0.011
- Pleochroism: Moderate dichroic

Pezzottaite, marketed under the name raspberyl or raspberry beryl, is a mineral species first recognized by the International Mineralogical Association in September 2003. Pezzottaite is a caesium analogue of beryl, a silicate of caesium, beryllium, lithium and aluminium, with the chemical formula Cs(Be_{2}Li)Al_{2}Si_{6}O_{18}. Named after Italian geologist and mineralogist Federico Pezzotta, pezzottaite was first thought to be either red beryl or a new variety of beryl ("caesium beryl"); unlike actual beryl, however, pezzottaite contains lithium and crystallizes in the trigonal crystal system rather than the hexagonal system.

== Appearance ==
Colors include shades of raspberry red to orange-red and pink. Recovered from miarolitic cavities in the granitic pegmatite fields of Fianarantsoa province, southern Madagascar, the pezzottaite crystals were small—no more than about 7 cm (2.8 in) in their widest dimension—and tabular or equant in habit, and few in number, most being heavily included with growth tubes and liquid feathers. Approximately 10 percent of the rough material would also exhibit chatoyancy when polished. Most cut pezzottaite gems are under one carat (200 mg) in weight and rarely exceed two carats (400 mg).

== Physical and optical properties ==
With the exception of hardness (8 on Mohs scale), the physical and optical properties of pezzottaite—i.e., specific gravity 3.10 (average), refractive index 1.601 to 1.620, birefringence 0.008 to 0.011 (uniaxial negative)—are all higher than typical beryl. Pezzottiate is brittle with a conchoidal to irregular fracture, and streaks white. Like beryl, it has an imperfect to fair basal cleavage. Pleochroism is moderate, from pink-orange or purplish pink to pinkish purple. Pezzottaite's absorption spectrum, as seen by a hand-held (direct vision) spectroscope, features a band at 485–500 nm with some specimens showing additional weak lines at 465 and 477 nm and a weak band at 550 to 580 nm.

== Deposits ==
The mineral was recovered from granitic pegmatite fields of Fianarantsoa province, southern Madagascar. Most (if not all) of the Madagascan deposits have since been exhausted. Pezzottaite has been found in at least one other locality, Afghanistan: this material was first thought to be caesium-rich morganite (pink beryl). Like morganite and red beryl, pezzottaite is believed to owe its color to radiation-induced color centres involving trivalent manganese. Pezzottaite will lose its color if heated to 450 °C for two hours, but the color can be restored with gamma irradiation.

== See also ==
- List of minerals
- List of minerals named after people
