= Cafetite =

Titanium oxide mineral

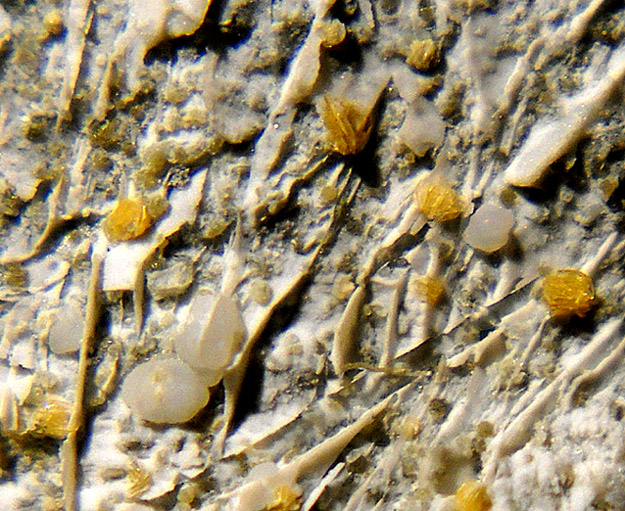
- Yellow cafetite crystals with green lizardite and calcite

General
- Category: oxide mineral
- Formula: (Ca,Mg)(Fe,Al)_{2}Ti_{4}O_{12}·4(H_{2}O)
- IMA symbol: Cft
- Strunz classification: 4.FL.75
- Crystal system: Monoclinic
- Crystal class: Prismatic (2/m) (same H-M symbol)
- Space group: P2_{1}/n
- Unit cell: a = 4.944 Å, b = 12.109 Å, c = 15.911 Å; β= 98.93°; Z = 8

Identification
- Color: Pale yellow to colorless
- Crystal habit: Elongated columnar to acicular crystals, fibrous aggregates, pseudo-orthorhombic
- Cleavage: Prismatic
- Tenacity: Brittle
- Mohs scale hardness: 4–5
- Luster: Adamantine
- Streak: White
- Diaphaneity: Semitransparent
- Specific gravity: 3.28
- Optical properties: Biaxial (–), 2V=58°, Dispersion very strong, r > v
- Refractive index: n_{α} = 1.95, n_{β} = 2.08, n_{γ} = 2.11
- Birefringence: δ = 0.16
- Pleochroism: none
- 2V angle: Measured: 38°

Cafetite is a rare titanium oxide mineral with formula (Ca,Mg)(Fe,Al)_{2}Ti_{4}O_{12}·4(H_{2}O). It is named for its composition, Ca-Fe-Ti.

It was first described in 1959 for an occurrence in the Afrikanda Massif, Afrikanda, Kola Peninsula, Murmanskaja Oblast, Northern Region, Russia. It is also reported from the Khibiny and Kovdor massifs of the Kola Peninsula and from Meagher County, Montana, US.

It occurs in pegmatites in a pyroxenite intrusion as crystals in miarolitic cavities. It occurs associated with ilmenite, titaniferous magnetite, titanite, anatase, perovskite, baddeleyite, phlogopite, clinochlore and kassite.
