= Zektzerite =

Mineral

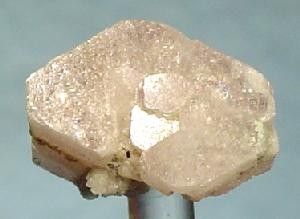

General
- Category: Inosilicate
- Formula: LiNa(Zr,Ti,Hf)Si_{6}O_{15}
- IMA symbol: Zek
- Strunz classification: 9.DN.05
- Crystal system: Orthorhombic
- Crystal class: Dipyramidal (mmm); H-M symbol: (2/m 2/m 2/m)
- Space group: Cmca

Identification
- Formula mass: 529.66 g/mol
- Color: Colorless to pink, cream, or white; commonly zoned
- Crystal habit: Stout pseudohexagonal prisms
- Cleavage: {100} and {010} perfect
- Mohs scale hardness: 6
- Luster: Vitreous to pearly
- Streak: White
- Diaphaneity: Translucent to transparent
- Specific gravity: 2.79
- Optical properties: Biaxial (-)
- Refractive index: n_{α} = 1.582 n_{β} = 1.584 n_{γ} = 1.584
- Ultraviolet fluorescence: Light yellow

The mineral zektzerite is a member of the tuhualite group and was first found in 1966 by Seattle mineralogist Benjamin Bartlett "Bart" Cannon. It was discovered in the Willow creek basin below Silver Star mountain in miarolitic cavities within the alkaline arfvedsonite granite phase of the Golden Horn batholith, Okanogan County, Washington. It is named for Jack Zektzer (born 1936), mathematician and mineral collector of Seattle, Washington.

The mineral was misidentified as alkali beryl (morganite) at that time. Subsequently, in September, 1975, additional specimens of the mineral were found in a "float boulder" (a glacial erratic, or dropstone) on the north side of Kangaroo Ridge at an approximate elevation of 6,500 feet (2,000 m); it was recognized that the material was not beryl.

== Properties ==
Synthesis: by fusion of Li_{2}CO_{3}, Na_{2}CO_{3}, SiO_{2}, ZrO_{2}. The resulting material has a brilliant blue-white fluorescence under short-wave ultraviolet light.

== Occurrence ==
Zektzerite is a mineral of agpaitic granites with arfvedsonite. It occurs with smoky quartz, microcline, okanoganite, sogdianite, astrophyllite, and zircon. It is found in cavities as euhedral crystals in the agpaitic-granite phase of the Golden Horn batholith, Okanogan County, Washington. It also occurs in blocks of pegmatite as rock-forming grains in a moraine of the Dara Pioz glacier in northern Tajikistan; in the Del Salto pluton in Aysén Province, Chile; as euhedral crystals at Virikkollen, Haneholmveien, Sandefjord, Norway; Ampasibitika, Ampasindava Peninsula, Madagascar; and as gemmy crystals up to 3 cm from Mt. Malosa Malawi.
