= Goshenite (gem) =

Variety of beryl

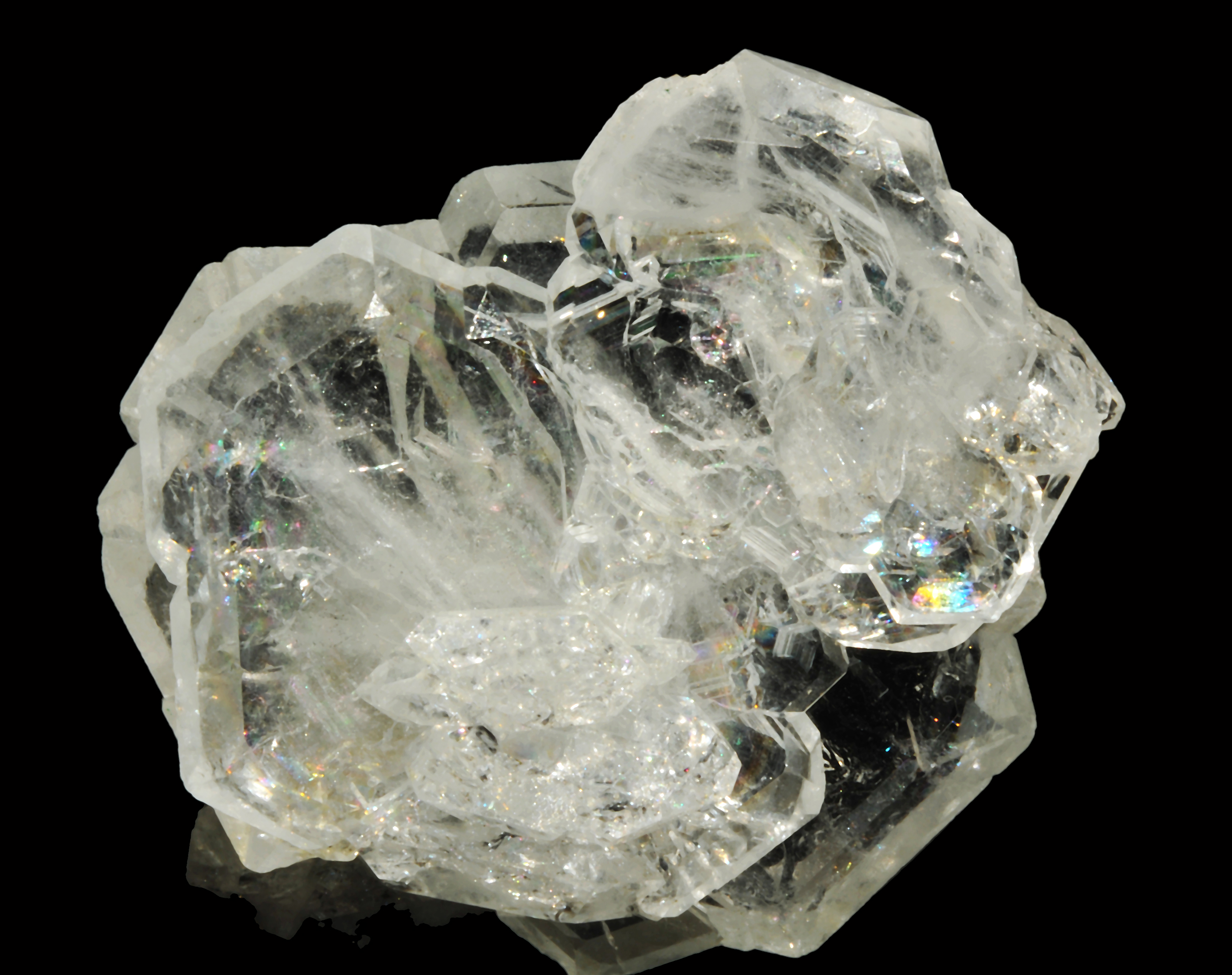

General
- Category: beryl
- Formula: Be_{3}Al_{2}(SiO_{3})_{6}

Identification
- Color: Colorless

Goshenite is a colorless gem variety of beryl. It is sometimes called the “mother of all gemstones” because the addition of various trace elements in nature transforms it into other gems, such as emerald, aquamarine, morganite, or bixbite. Goshenite is also the purest form of beryl because the inclusion of impurities would transform it into a different form of beryl. The gem is used as imitation for diamond or emerald by adding colored foil on it.

== Name ==
Goshenite is named after Goshen, Massachusetts, United States, where it was first found. It is also known as white beryl or lucid beryl.

== Value and treatments ==
Goshenite is not popular in the jewelry industry because of its colorlessness and lack of brilliance, luster, or fire. It is also inexpensive due to the fact it is abundant.

Although the gem value of goshenite is relatively low, it can be colored yellow, green, pink, blue, and in intermediate colors by irradiating it with gamma rays and bombarding it with neutrons from nuclear reactors and radioactive materials. The resulting color depends on the content of Ca, Sc, Ti, V, Fe, and Co impurities.

== Occurrence ==
It is most commonly found inside granite. It can also be found in metamorphic rocks. It occurs in association with muscovite, schorl, albite, scheelite, fluorite, elbaite, morganite and quartz. Goshenite can be found in countries like China, Canada, Namibia, Brazil, Russia, Mexico, Pakistan, Myanmar, the United States (especially California and Maine), and Madagascar.
