= Kassite (mineral) =

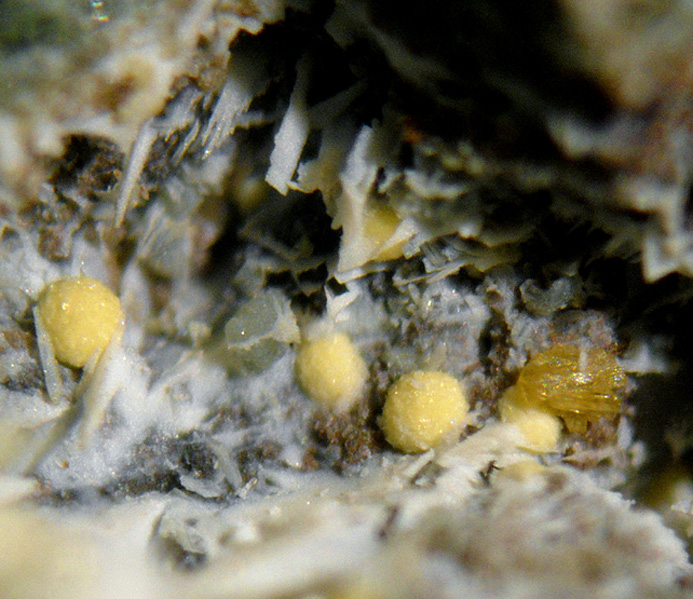
- Light yellow kassite's spherules with orange-yellow tabular cafetite in lizardite matrix. Base 2 mm. Locality: Val di Serra Quarry, Pilcante, Ala, Lagarina Valley, Trento Province, Trentino-Alto Adige (Trentino-Südtirol), Italy

General
- Category: Hydroxide mineral
- Formula: CaTi_{2}O_{4}(OH)_{2}
- Strunz classification: 4.DH.10
- Dana classification: 08.03.09
- Crystal system: Monoclinic
- Crystal class: Prismatic (2/m) (same H-M symbol)
- Space group: P2_{1}/a

Identification
- Formula mass: 235.09 g/mol
- Color: Brown red, colorless, light yellow
- Crystal habit: Pseudo hexagonal
- Twinning: Common, on {101} and {181}.
- Cleavage: {010} Perfect, {101} Indistinct
- Fracture: Brittle
- Tenacity: Very brittle
- Mohs scale hardness: 5
- Luster: Adamantine
- Streak: White
- Specific gravity: 3.42
- Density: 3.42
- Optical properties: Biaxial (–), 2V=58°, dispersion very strong, r > v
- Refractive index: n_{α} = 1.95, n_{β} = 2.13, n_{γ} = 2.21
- Birefringence: δ = 0.26
- Pleochroism: none
- Other characteristics: Not radioactive

Kassite is a rare mineral whose chemical formula is CaTi_{2}O_{4}(OH)_{2}. It crystallizes in the orthorhombic crystal system and forms radiating rosettes and pseudo-hexagonal tabular crystals which are commonly twinned. Kassite crystals are brownish pink to pale yellow in color, are translucent, and have an adamantine luster. Cleavage is distinctly visible, and the crystals are very brittle.

It was first described in 1965 in the Afrikanda pyroxenite massif, a formation on Russia's Kola Peninsula and was named for Nikolai Grigorievich Kassin (1885–1949), a prominent Russian geologist. It occurs as miarolytic cavity fillings of alkalic pegmatites in the Kola occurrence and in nepheline syenite in the Magnet Cove igneous complex of Arkansas, US. Its mineral association includes cafetite (which with it is also polymorphous), perovskite, titanite, rutile and ilmenite.
