= Bixbyite =

Manganese-iron mixed oxide mineral

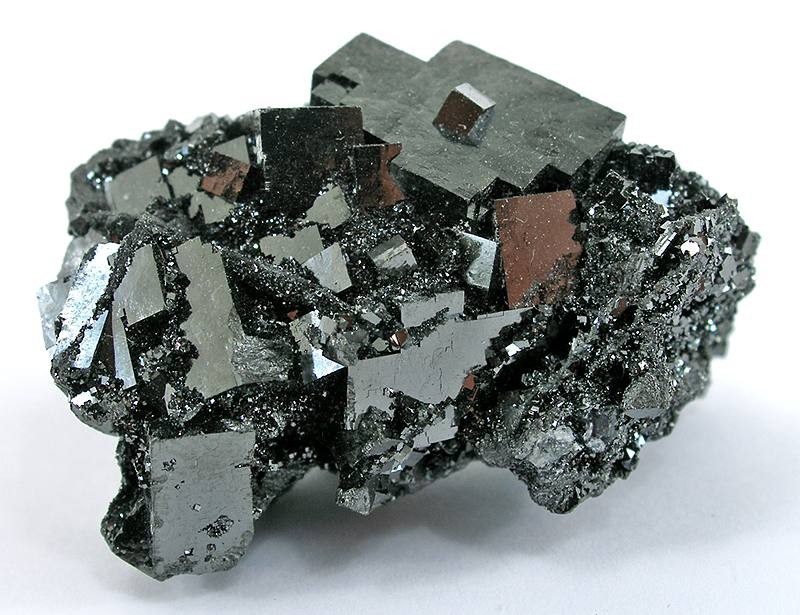

General
- Category: Oxide minerals
- Formula: (Mn,Fe)_{2}O_{3}
- IMA symbol: Bxb
- Strunz classification: 4.CB.10
- Dana classification: 4.3.7.2
- Crystal system: Cubic
- Crystal class: Diploidal (m3̅); H-M symbol: (2/m 3̅)
- Space group: Ia3̅
- Unit cell: a = 9.411 Å; Z = 16

Identification
- Formula mass: 158.33 g/mol
- Color: Black
- Crystal habit: Massive to crystalline
- Twinning: On {111}, as penetration twins
- Cleavage: Imperfect on {111}, in traces
- Fracture: Irregular to uneven
- Mohs scale hardness: 6 – 6 1/2
- Luster: Metallic
- Streak: Black
- Diaphaneity: Opaque
- Specific gravity: 5.12
- Density: 4.95
- Optical properties: Isotropic
- Refractive index: 2.51 – 2.56
- Common impurities: Al, Mg, Si, Ti

Bixbyite is a manganese iron oxide mineral with chemical formula: (Mn,Fe)_{2}O_{3}. The iron/manganese ratio is quite variable and many specimens have almost no iron. It is a metallic dark black with a Mohs hardness of 6.0 – 6.5. It is a somewhat rare mineral sought after by collectors as it typically forms euhedral isometric crystals exhibiting various cubes, octahedra, and dodecahedra.

It is commonly associated with beryl, quartz, spessartine, hematite, pseudobrookite, hausmannite, braunite and topaz in pneumatolytic or hydrothermal veins and cavities and in metamorphic rocks. It can also be found in lithophysal cavities in rhyolite. Typical localities are Jhabua and Chhindwara districts, India and the Thomas Range in Juab County, Utah. It is also reported from San Luis Potosi, Mexico; northern Patagonia, Argentina; Girona, Catalonia, Spain; Sweden, Germany, Namibia, Zimbabwe, and South Africa.

Bixbyite was named for the American mineralogist Maynard Bixby (1853–1935), responsible for its discovery in 1897. It should not be confused with bixbite, a red form of beryl; to avoid confusion, this name has been deprecated from the CIBJO and the IMA.

== See also ==
- List of minerals
- List of minerals named after people
