= Chemical impurity =

Substance within a material that differs from its chemical composition

In chemistry and materials science, impurities are chemical substances inside a confined amount of liquid, gas, or solid. They differ from the chemical composition of the material or compound. Firstly, a pure chemical should appear in at least one chemical phase and can also be characterized by its phase diagram. Secondly, a pure chemical should prove to be homogeneous (i.e., a uniform substance that has the same composition throughout the material). The perfect pure chemical will pass all attempts to separate and purify it further. Thirdly, and here we focus on the common chemical definition, it should not contain any trace of any other kind of chemical species. In reality, there are no absolutely 100% pure chemical compounds, as there is always some small amount of contamination.

The levels of impurities in a material are generally defined in relative terms. Standards have been established by various organizations that attempt to define the permitted levels of various impurities in a manufactured product. Strictly speaking, a material's level of purity can only be stated as being more or less pure than some other material.

Impurities are either naturally occurring or added during synthesis of a chemical or commercial product. During production, impurities may be purposely or accidentally added to the substance. The removal of unwanted impurities may require the use of separation or purification techniques such as distillation or zone refining. In other cases, impurities might be added to acquire certain properties of a material such as the color in gemstones or conductivity in semiconductors. Impurities may also affect crystallization as they can act as nucleation sites that start crystal growth. Impurities can also play a role in nucleation of other phase transitions in the form of defects.

== Unwanted impurities ==
Impurities can become unwanted when they prevent the working nature of the material. Examples include ash and debris in metals and leaf pieces in blank white papers. The removal of impurities is usually done chemically. For example, in the manufacturing of iron, calcium carbonate is added to the blast furnaces to remove silicon dioxide from the iron ore. Zone refining, another purification method, is an economically important method for the purification of semiconductors.

A basic distillation set up

However, some kinds of impurities can be removed by physical means. A mixture of water and salt can be separated by distillation, with water as the distillate and salt as the solid residue. This is done by heating the water so it boils and leaves behind the salt. The water is cooled and the gas turns back to a pure liquid. Impurities are usually physically removed from liquids and gases. Removal of sand particles from metal ore is one example with solids.

No matter what method is used, it is usually impossible to separate an impurity completely from a material. The reason that it is impossible to remove impurities completely is of thermodynamic nature and is predicted by the second law of thermodynamics. Removing impurities completely means reducing their concentration to zero. This would require an infinite amount of work and energy as predicted by the second law of thermodynamics. What technicians can do is to increase the purity of a material to as near 100% as possible or economically feasible.

Impurities in pharmaceuticals and therapeutics are of special concern and the last couple of decades have witnessed a large number of scandals, from ingredients and incorrect dosage forms to intentionally fortified medications and accidental contaminations.

== Wanted impurities ==
Occasionally, we may want to include impurities in a material to change its properties. These impurities can be naturally occurring and left unaltered in a material or be intentionally added during synthesis. These types of impurities can show up in our day-to-day lives such as different colors in gemstones or by doping to tune the conductivity of semiconductors.

An example of when impurities are wanted is shown in gems. These gems have slight impurities that act as chromophores and give the stone its color. An example is the gem family beryl which has the base chemical formula of Be_{3}Al_{2}(SiO_{3})_{6}. Pure beryl will appear colorless but this rarely occurs and the presence of trace elements change its color. The green of emeralds are from impurities such as chromium, vanadium, or iron. A manganese impurity will give a pink gem called morganite and iron creates the blue gem aquamarine.

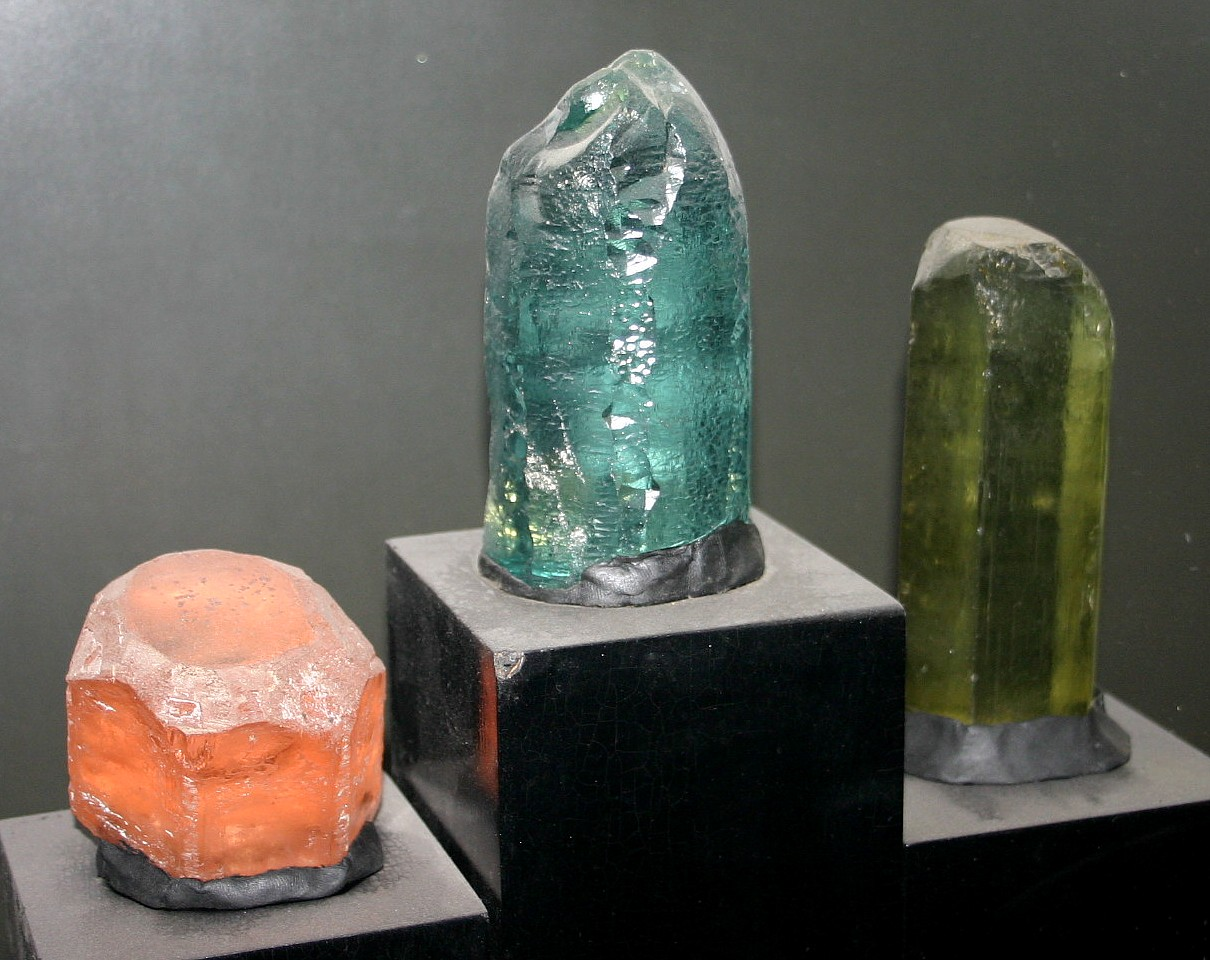
Three gems from the beryl family with different colors.

Doping is a process where impurities are purposefully added to semiconductors to increase electrical conductivity and improve a semiconductors function. The dopants, the elements added to the original crystal structure, contain a different number of electrons then the base formula. Semiconductors that are p-doped contains a small amount of elements that have less valence electrons then the other elements in the crystal. N-doping is the opposite and the dopant contains more valence electrons.

== Impurities and nucleation ==
When an impure liquid is cooled to its melting point the liquid, undergoing a phase transition, crystallizes around the impurities and becomes a crystalline solid. If there are no impurities then the liquid is said to be pure and can be supercooled below its melting point without becoming a solid. This occurs because the liquid has nothing to condense around so the solid cannot form a natural crystalline solid. The solid is eventually formed when dynamic arrest or glass transition occurs, but it forms into an amorphous solid – a glass, instead, as there is no long-range order in the structure.

Impurities play an important role in the nucleation of other phase transitions. For example, the presence of foreign elements may have important effects on the mechanical and magnetic properties of metal alloys. Iron atoms in copper cause the renowned Kondo effect where the conduction electron spins form a magnetic bound state with the impurity atom. Magnetic impurities in superconductors can serve as generation sites for vortex defects. Point defects can nucleate reversed domains in ferromagnets and dramatically affect their coercivity. In general impurities are able to serve as initiation points for phase transitions because the energetic cost of creating a finite-size domain of a new phase is lower at a point defect. In order for the nucleus of a new phase to be stable, it must reach a critical size. This threshold size is often lower at an impurity site.

== See also ==
- Dross
- Fineness
- Pollution
- Slag
- Spin wave
