= Maynard Bixby =

American mineralogist and mineral collector

Maynard Bixby (June 28, 1853 – February 18, 1935) was an American mineralogist and mineral collector.

== Early life ==
Bixby was born in Wyalusing, Pennsylvania and graduated from Lafayette College in Easton, Pennsylvania in 1876. He worked for a time in Wilkes Barre, Pennsylvania, where he was a bookkeeper and studied law. He then decided to travel the country and became involved in mining in Colorado and Arizona.

== Career ==
Bixby explored the Thomas Range in Juab County, Utah for minerals and staked several claims for topaz. One, the Maynard's Claim, is still being mined for specimens. The mineral bixbyite, which he discovered there, was named in his honor in 1897. The rare, red beryl also found there, originally named bixbite in his honor, was later renamed "red beryl" to avoid confusion with bixbyite.

Bixby wrote articles for The Mineral Collector. In the December 1896 issue Bixby published his first ad, a full-page one, in which this text appeared:

For several years I have collected the very finest of the Utah minerals and have concluded to offer them direct to collectors at the following low prices ...

In 1902 he published the first edition of his authoritative A Catalogue of Utah Minerals and Localities, and by 1916 had issued a fourth edition.

== Death ==
Bixby died in San Diego, California.
