= Red beryl =

Rare variety of beryl

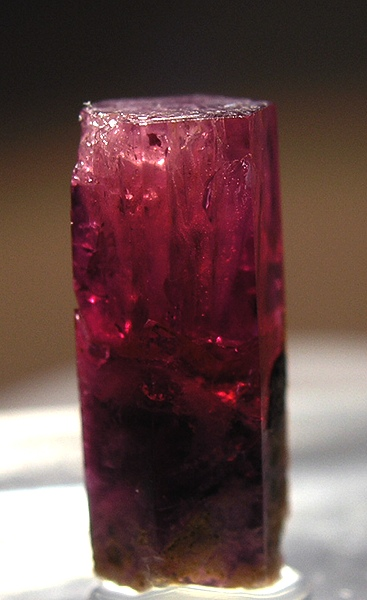

General
- Category: Cyclosilicate beryl
- Formula: Be_{3}Al_{2}Si_{6}O_{18} with a mix of Mn^{3+} ions
- Crystal system: Hexagonal
- Space group: P6/mcc

Identification
- Color: Dark red
- Twinning: Extremely rare
- Cleavage: Indistinct
- Fracture: Conchoidal
- Mohs scale hardness: 7.5–8
- Luster: Vitreous
- Streak: White
- Specific gravity: 2.66–2.87
- Optical properties: Uniaxial (−)
- Refractive index: 1.560–1.577
- Birefringence: δ = 0.0040–0.0080
- Dispersion: 0.014
- Ultraviolet fluorescence: None

Red beryl, formerly known as bixbite and marketed as red emerald or scarlet emerald, is an extremely rare variety of beryl as well as one of the rarest minerals on Earth. The gem gets its red color from manganese ions incorporated within the beryl crystal structure. The color of red beryl is stable up to 1,000 °C (1,830 °F). Red beryl can come in various tints like strawberry, bright ruby, cherry, and orange.

The largest crystals of red beryl are about 2 cm (0.79 in) wide and 5 cm (2.0 in) long. However, most crystals are under 1 cm (0.39 in) long. Recently, the red variety of pezzottaite has been sold in markets as red beryl by some sellers.

== History ==
Red beryl was discovered in 1904 by Maynard Bixby in the Thomas Range in mid-western Utah. In 1912 the gem was named bixbite by Alfred Eppler after Maynard Bixby. The old synonym "bixbite" is deprecated, since it can cause confusion with the mineral bixbyite.

The greatest concentration of gem-grade red beryl comes from the Ruby-Violet Claim in the Wah Wah Mountains, discovered in 1958 by Lamar Hodges, of Fillmore, Utah, while he was prospecting for uranium.

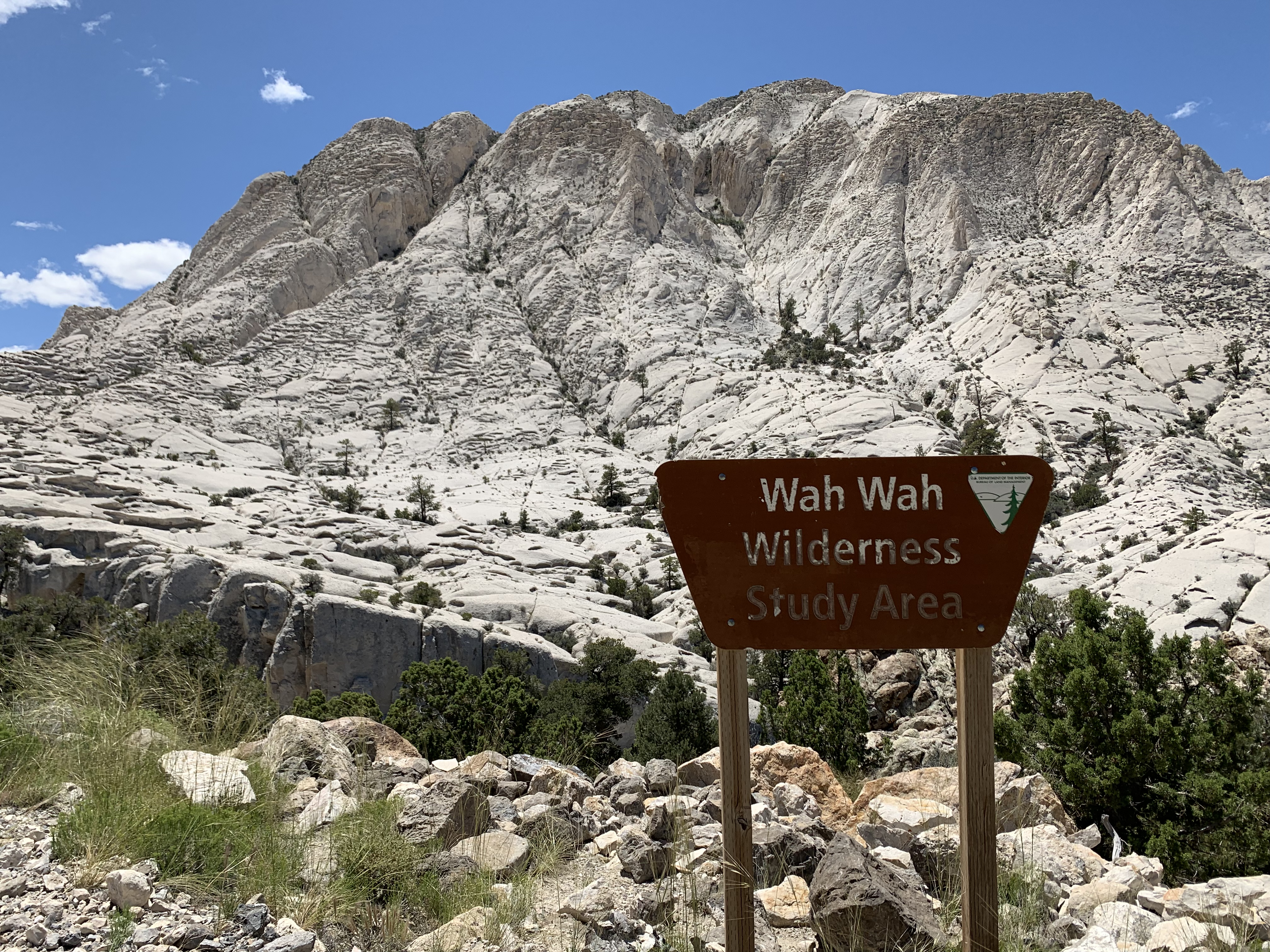
Gem-quality red beryl have only been found in the Wah Wah mountains

== Rarity ==
Red beryl is very rare and has been reported only from a handful of locations: Wah Wah Mountains, Paramount Canyon, Round Mountain and Juab County, all in the south-western United States. The narrow geographic range suggests that the specific conditions needed for its formation do not occur frequently. This gem is a thousand times rarer than gold.

The Utah Geological Survey estimated that one red beryl is found for every 150,000 diamonds. According to Gemmological Association of Great Britain a 2 carat red beryl is as rare as a 40 carat diamond.

Red beryl is valued roughly the same price or higher than emerald despite being a hundred times rarer. Its rarity has made it less popular but red beryl crystals that are over 1 carat can sell for US$20,000. In 2008, one carat could sell for US$5000 or more.

Limited geographical occurrence means that the Red Emerald Inc controlled world production of natural red beryl as of 2021.

== Characteristics ==
The dark red color of red beryl is attributed to Mn^{3+} ions. Red beryl rough crystals can be easily distinguished by hexagonal crystal systems. This gem has been known to be confused with pezzottaite, a caesium analog of beryl, that has been found in Madagascar and more recently Afghanistan; cut gems of the two varieties can be distinguished from their difference in refractive index. Red beryl is similar to emerald and dissimilar to other beryls in that it has inclusions like feathers and fractures. Some mineral inclusions include quartz, feldspar, hematite, and bixbyite.

=== Chemistry ===
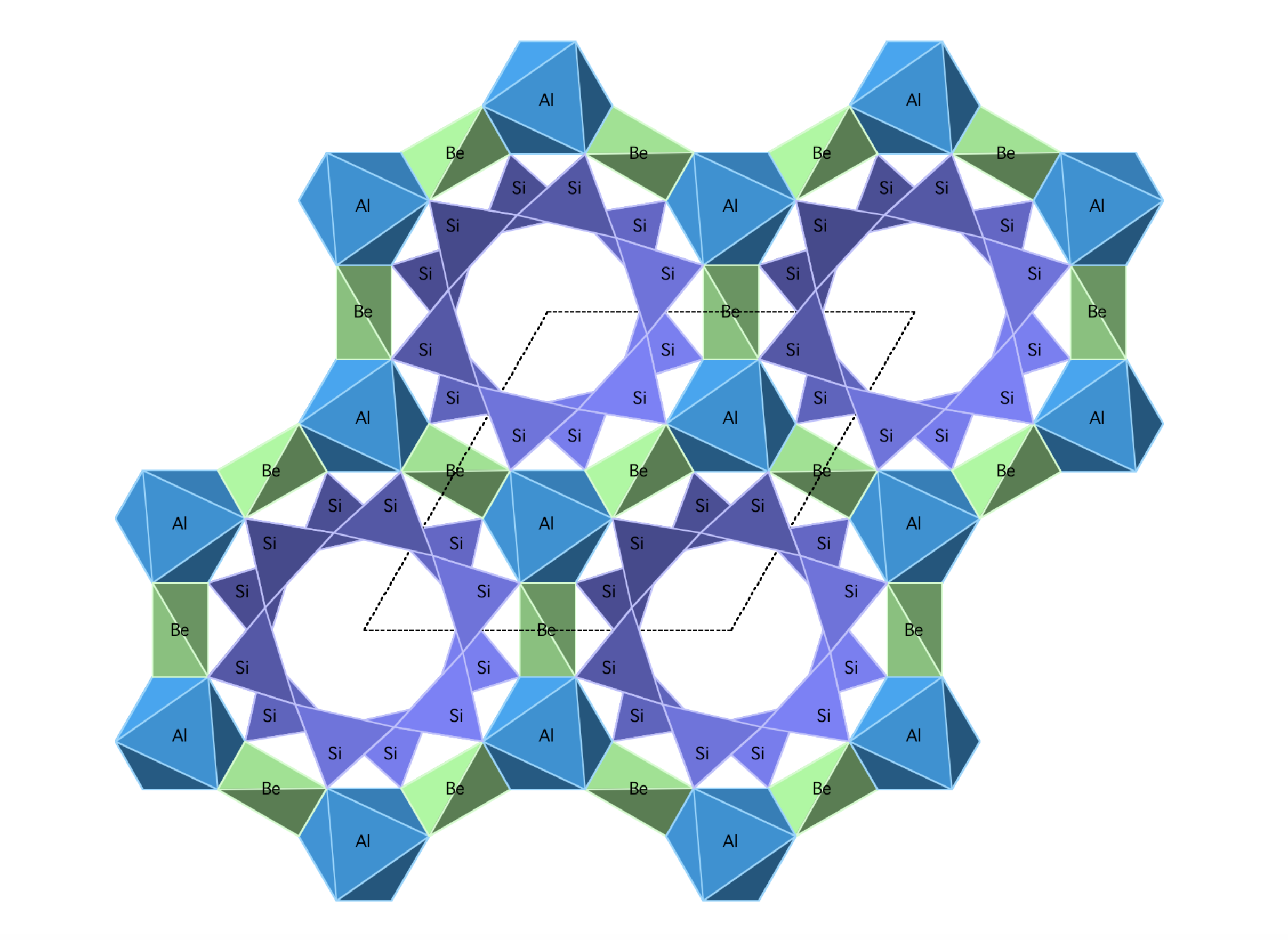
Arrangement of coordination complexes forming the hexagonal structure of the beryl crystal.

The hexagonal crystal system found in beryls are formed of AlO_{6} octahedra, as well as BeO_{4} and SiO_{4} tetrahedra. The hexagonal channels of red beryl are primarily unoccupied and no detectable water has been found within. Red beryl gets its color from natural chemical doping, whereby Mn^{3+}O_{6} replaces AlO_{6} at certain positions. The deep color Mn^{3+}O_{6} may be in part explained by the Jahn-Teller effect on spin disallowed transitions.

== Formation ==
While gem beryls are ordinarily found in pegmatites and certain metamorphic rock, red beryl forms in topaz-bearing rhyolites. It is formed by crystallizing under low pressure and high temperature from a pneumatolytic phase along fractures or within near-surface miarolitic cavities of the rhyolite. Associated minerals include bixbyite, quartz, orthoclase, topaz, spessartine, pseudobrookite and hematite. Synthetic red beryl is produced using hydrothermal process similar to that used for emeralds, however cobalt and manganese are used as dopants to produce a dark red gem.
