= Johan August Arfwedson =

Swedish chemist (1792–1841)

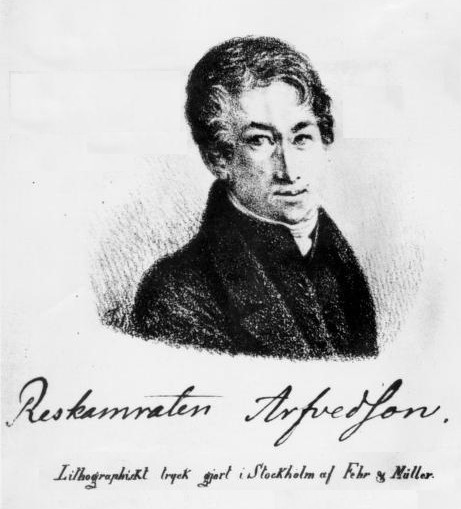
- Johan August Arfwedson
- Born: 12 January 1792; Sweden
- Died: 28 October 1841 (aged 49)
- Education: University of Uppsala
- Known for: Discovered lithium
- Scientific career
- Fields: Chemistry

Johan August Arfwedson (12 January 1792 – 28 October 1841) was a Swedish chemist who discovered the chemical element lithium in 1817 by isolating it as a salt.

== Life and work ==
Arfwedson was born into a wealthy bourgeois family, the son of the wholesale merchant and factory owner Jacob Arfwedson and his wife, Anna Elisabeth Holtermann. The younger Arfwedson matriculated as a student at the University of Uppsala in 1803 (at the time, matriculating at a young age was common for aristocratic and wealthy students), completed a degree in Law in 1809 and a second degree in mineralogy in 1812. In the latter year, he received an unpaid position in the Royal Board of Mines, where he advanced to the position of notary (still without a salary) in 1814.

In Stockholm, Arfwedson knew the chemist Jöns Jakob Berzelius and received access to his private laboratory, where he discovered the element lithium in 1817, during analysis of the mineral petalite. The actual isolation of lithium metal would be done by others.

In 1818 and 1819, Arfwedson made a European journey, partly in the society of Berzelius. After coming home, Arfwedson built his own laboratory on his estate. He spent the larger part of his remaining life administering and multiplying his inherited wealth.

He was elected a member of the Royal Swedish Academy of Sciences in 1821.

The rare mineral arfvedsonite was named after him.

== See also ==
- Humphry Davy
- William Thomas Brande
