= Poudretteite =

Сyclosilicate mineral

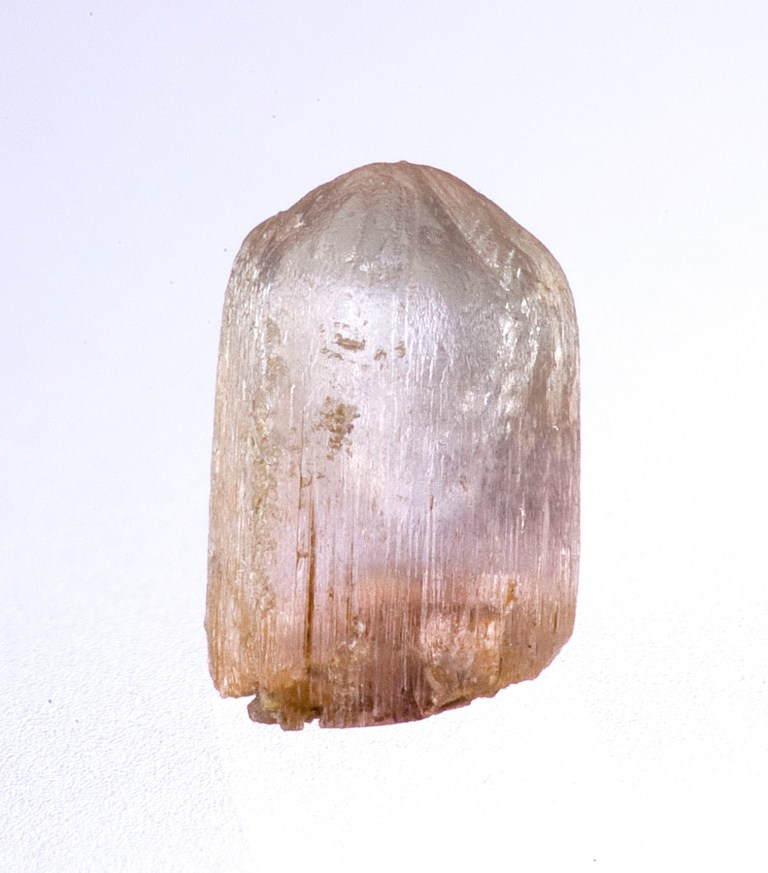

General
- Category: Cyclosilicate
- Formula: KNa_{2}B_{3}Si_{12}O_{30}
- IMA symbol: Pou
- Strunz classification: 9.CM.05
- Dana classification: 63.02.01a.08
- Crystal system: Hexagonal
- Crystal class: Dihexagonal dipyramidal (6/mmm); H-M symbol: (6/m 2/m 2/m)
- Space group: P6/mcc
- Unit cell: 1,221.72 Å³

Identification
- Color: Colorless, Light pink
- Crystal habit: Roughly equant barrel-shaped prismatic crystals
- Cleavage: None
- Fracture: Conchoidal, splintery
- Tenacity: Brittle
- Mohs scale hardness: 5
- Luster: Vitreous (Glassy)
- Streak: White
- Diaphaneity: Transparent
- Specific gravity: 2.51
- Density: 2.51
- Optical properties: Uniaxial (+)
- Refractive index: 1.511 to 1.532
- Birefringence: 0.021
- Pleochroism: Colorless to pink

Poudretteite is an extremely rare mineral and gemstone that was first discovered as minute crystals in Mont St. Hilaire, Quebec, Canada, during the 1960s. The mineral was named for the Poudrette family, the owners of the quarry where poudretteite was originally found. Poudretteite is very faintly radioactive.
