= Pseudobrookite =

Iron titanium oxide mineral

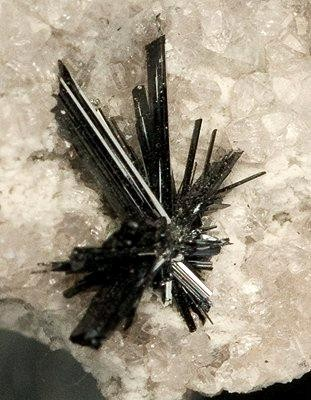
- Spray of pseudobrookite needles from Topaz Mountain in Utah (size: 2.7 × 2.0 × 1.6 cm)

General
- Category: Oxide mineral
- Formula: Fe_{2}TiO_{5}
- IMA symbol: Pbrk
- Strunz classification: 4.CB.15
- Crystal system: Orthorhombic
- Crystal class: Dipyramidal (mmm); H-M symbol: (2/m 2/m 2/m)
- Space group: Bbmm
- Unit cell: a = 9.81 Å, b = 9.95 Å, c = 3.73 Å; Z = 8

Identification
- Color: Dark reddish brown, brownish black, black
- Crystal habit: Prismatic to needle like, striated
- Cleavage: Distinct on {010}
- Fracture: Uneven to subconchoidal
- Mohs scale hardness: 6
- Luster: Adamantine, greasy, metallic
- Streak: Brown
- Diaphaneity: Opaque, transparent in thin splinters
- Specific gravity: 4.33–4.39
- Optical properties: Biaxial (+)
- Refractive index: n_{α} = 2.350 n_{β} = 2.390 n_{γ} = 2.420
- Birefringence: δ = 0.070
- 2V angle: Measured: 50°

Pseudobrookite is an iron titanium oxide mineral with formula: Fe_{2}TiO_{5} or (Fe^{3+},Fe^{2+})_{2}(Ti,Fe^{2+})O_{5}.

== Discovery and occurrence ==
Pseudobrookite was first described in 1878 for an occurrence in Uroi Hill (Arany Hill), Simeria, Hunedoara County, Romania. The name is from Greek ψευδής, for false, and brookite because of its misleading similar appearance to brookite.

Pseudobrookite forms as pneumatolytic deposition and alteration within titanium-rich volcanic rocks such as andesite, rhyolite or basalt. It may be associated with xenoliths contained in the volcanics. It also commonly occurs in lithophysae.

It occurs associated with hematite, magnetite, bixbyite, ilmenite, enstatite-ferrosilite, tridymite, quartz, sanidine, topaz, spessartine, beryl, mica, cassiterite and apatite.

Occurrences include:

- Mayen in the Eifel district, Germany
- Mont Dore, Puy-de-Dome, France
- Vesuvius, Italy
- Jumilla, Murcia Province, Spain
- Faial and São Miguel Islands, Azores
- Kilimanjaro, Tanzania;
- Reunion Island
- the Thomas Range, Juab County, Utah
- Crater Lake and Lemolo Lake, Oregon
- the Black Range, Sierra County, New Mexico
- Cerro los Remedios, Durango, Mexico
