= Morganite (gem) =

Beryl variety

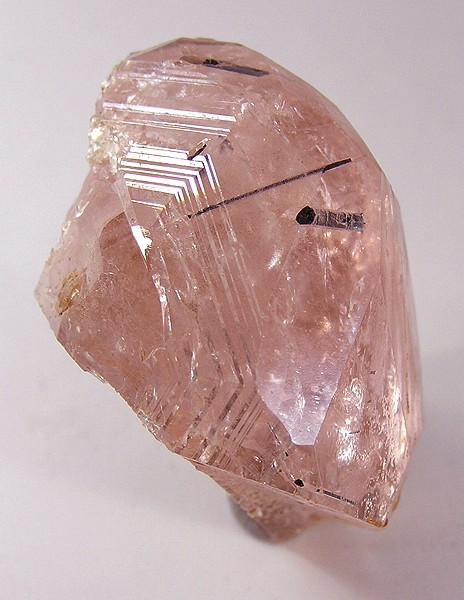
- Morganite from Brazil with inclusions of black schorl

General
- Category: beryl
- Formula: Be_{3}Al_{2}(Si_{6}O_{18})

Identification
- Color: Pink
- Mohs scale hardness: 7.5 to 8

Morganite is an orange or pink variety of beryl and is also a gemstone. Morganite is mined in Brazil, Afghanistan, Mozambique, Namibia, the United States, and Madagascar.

Morganite has grown in popularity since 2010. Brides and CNN have listed it as a possible alternative to diamond for engagement rings.

It mostly occurs in association with minerals like: albite, cleavelandite, quartz, aquamarine, elbaite, lepidolite, schorl, tourmaline and muscovite.

== Name ==
Following the discovery of a new locality for rose beryl in Madagascar in 1910, George Frederick Kunz proposed the name morganite at a meeting of the New York Academy of Sciences on 5 December 1910 to honour his friend and customer J.P. Morgan for his financial support for the arts and sciences, and his important gifts of gems to the American Museum of Natural History in New York and to the Museum of Natural History in Paris. Morgan was one of the most important gem collectors in the early 1900s – his collection was partly assembled by Tiffany and Company and their chief gemmologist, Kunz.

Morganite is also known as pink beryl, rose beryl, pink emerald, and "cesian (or caesian) beryl".

== Characteristics ==
The pink color of morganite is attributed to Mn^{2+} ions. Morganite is pleochroic; when it is viewed down its crystallographic axis the color is more pink.

In comparison to emerald, morganite has fewer inclusions and fractures, thus making it more durable than emerald.

== History ==
Pink beryl of fine color and good sizes was first discovered on an island off the coast of Madagascar in 1910. It was also known, with other gemstone minerals, such as tourmaline and kunzite, at Pala, California. In December 1910, the New York Academy of Sciences named the pink variety of beryl "morganite" after financier J. P. Morgan.

On October 7, 1989, one of the largest gem morganite specimens ever uncovered, eventually called "The Rose of Maine", was found at the Bennett Quarry in Buckfield, Maine, US. The crystal, originally somewhat orange in hue, was 23 cm (9 in) long and about 30 cm (12 in) across, and weighed (along with its matrix) just over 50 pounds (23 kg).

Before 2011, morganite was unknown in many jewelry stores. But, recently morganite has been increasing in popularity.

== Value and popularity ==
According to a 2017 survey, morganite is the second most popular non-diamond stone, after sapphire. A single carat of morganite can cost about $300.

Morganite is one of the rarest members of the beryl family, second only to red beryl. Due to the scarcity of morganites, especially those of high quality, they tend to be among the most expensive per carat. Ones that are deep pink in color tend to be the most valuable.
