= Thomas Range =

Mountain range in Utah, USA

Coordinates: 39°43′40″N 113°07′44″W

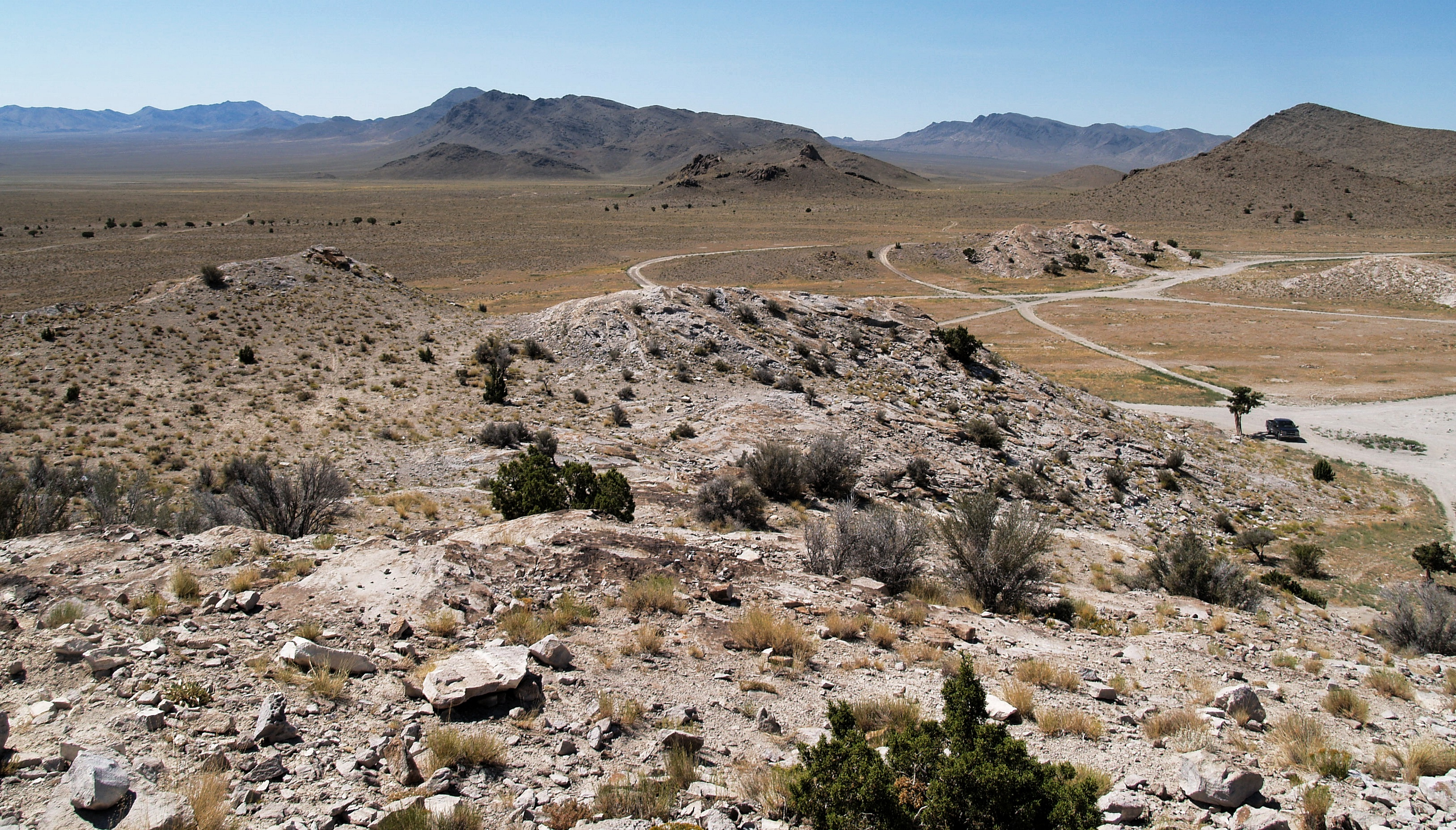
Topaz Mountain in the Thomas Range, August 2008

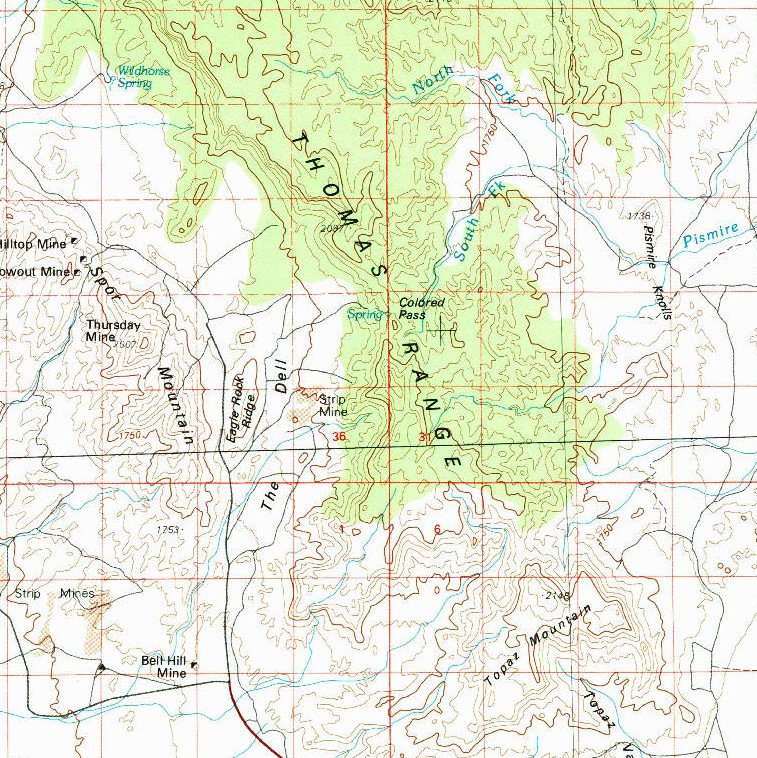
Thomas Range Topographic Map USGS

The Thomas Range is a mountain range of north central Juab County of western Utah, United States. Topaz Mountain is in the southern part of the range and Spor Mountain lies to the southwest.
