= Miarolitic cavity =

Crystal-lined irregular cavities in rocks

Miarolitic cavities (or miarolitic texture) are typically crystal-lined irregular cavities or vugs most commonly found in granitic pegmatites, and also in a variety of igneous rocks. The central portions of pegmatites are often miarolitic as the pegmatite dike crystallizes from the outside walls toward the center. The volatile portion of the magma is gradually excluded from the forming crystal phases until it becomes trapped within the body and forms the cavities which often contain minerals of elements incompatible with the typical silicate granitic mineralogy.

The miarolitic cavities and miarolitic pegmatites are sources of rare and unusual minerals containing elements not found in abundance in normal igneous rocks. Minerals containing lithium, rubidium, beryllium, boron, niobium, tantalum, tin, bismuth, fluorine and other elements can be found.

The term miarolitic comes from the Italian miarolo in reference to a variety of granite, rich in cavities, from Baveno in northern Italy.
