= Under Armour =

American sports clothing and accessories company

Under Armour, Inc.

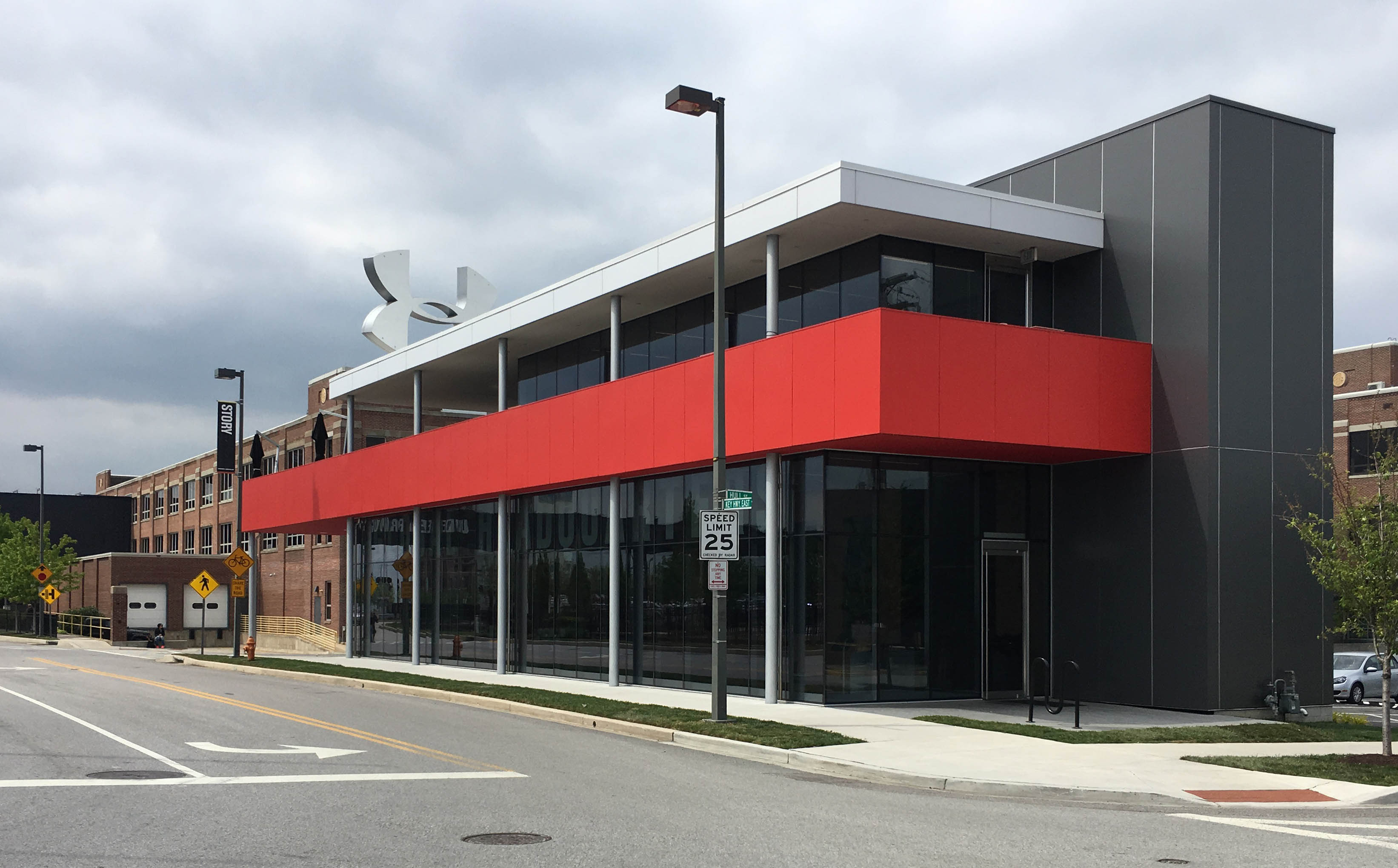
- Headquarters in Baltimore
- Type: Public
- Traded as: NYSE: UAA (Class A); NYSE: UA (Class C); S&P 600 components (A & C)
- ISIN: US9043111072; US9043112062
- Industry: Textile, sports equipment
- Founded: September 25, 1996; 30 years ago
- Founder: Kevin Plank
- Headquarters: Baltimore, Maryland, U.S.
- Area served: Worldwide
- Key people: Mohamed El-Erian (chairman); Kevin Plank (president and CEO)
- Products: Footwear, sportswear, clothing, toiletries
- Revenue: ▼US$5.164 billion (2025)
- Operating income: ▼ −US$185 million (2025)
- Net income: ▼ −US$201 million (2025)
- Total assets: ▼US$4.301 billion (2025)
- Total equity: ▼US$1.890 billion (2025)
- Number of employees: 14,400 (2025)
- Subsidiaries: Curry Brand
- Website: underarmour.com
- Footnotes; Financials as of March 31, 2025.

Under Armour, Inc. is an American sportswear company that manufactures footwear and apparel headquartered in Baltimore, Maryland, United States.

== History ==
=== 20th century ===
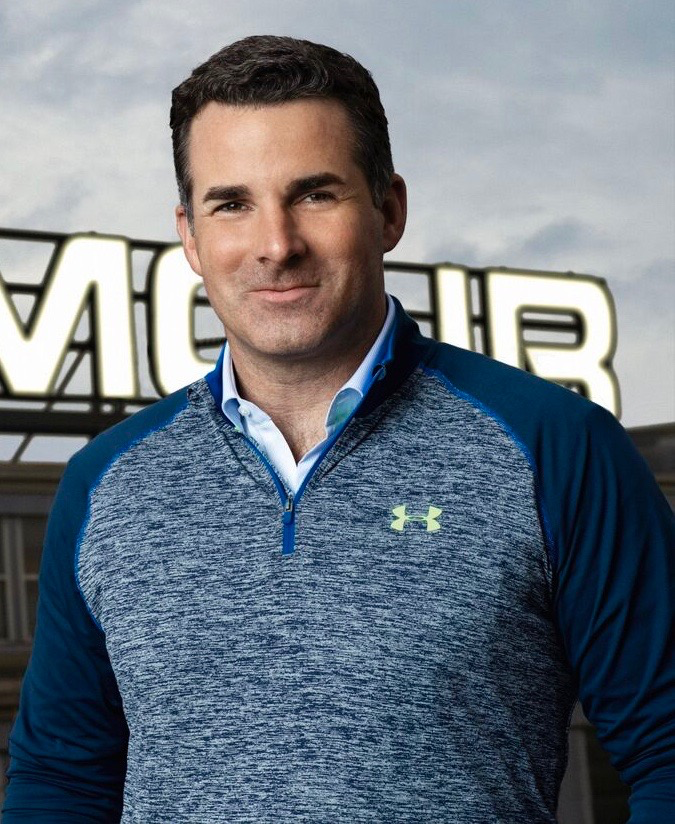
Kevin Plank, founder of Under Armour, in 2018

Under Armour was founded on September 25, 1996, by Kevin Plank, a then-24 year old former special teams captain of the University of Maryland football team. Plank initially began the business from his grandmother's basement in Washington, D.C. He spent his time traveling along the East Coast with nothing but apparel in the trunk of his car. His first team sale came at the end of 1996 with a $17,000 sale. From his grandmother's Washington, D.C.-area rowhouse, Plank moved to Baltimore.

As a fullback at the University of Maryland, Plank got tired of having to change out of the sweat-soaked T-shirts worn under his jersey; however, he noticed that his compression shorts worn during practice stayed dry. This inspired him to make a T-shirt using moisture-wicking synthetic fabric.

After graduating from the University of Maryland, Plank developed his first prototype of the shirt, which he gave to his Maryland teammates and friends who had gone on to play in the National Football League, and soon improved the design, creating a new T-shirt built from microfibers that wicked moisture away. Major competing brands including Nike, Adidas and Reebok would soon follow with their own moisture-wicking apparel. Plank opted to use the British spelling "armour" in the company name because the toll-free vanity number was still available for that version.

People began to take notice of the brand when a front-page photo of USA Today featured Oakland Raiders quarterback Jeff George wearing an Under Armour mock turtleneck. Under Armour's first major sale came when an equipment manager from Georgia Tech requested 10 shirts from Plank. Contracts with NC State, Arizona State, and other Division I football teams followed. That year, Under Armour launched several new apparel lines including ColdGear, TurfGear, AllseasonGear, and StreetGear. By the end of 1996, Under Armour had sold 500 Under Armour HeatGear shirts, generating $17,000 for the company. In 1997, Plank had $100,000 in orders to fill and found a factory in Ohio to make the shirts.

In late 1999 and early 2000, Under Armour received its first big break when Warner Brothers used Under Armour in two of its feature films, Oliver Stone's Any Given Sunday and The Replacements. Leveraging the release of Any Given Sunday, Plank purchased an ad in ESPN The Magazine, which generated close to $750,000 in sales.

=== 21st century ===
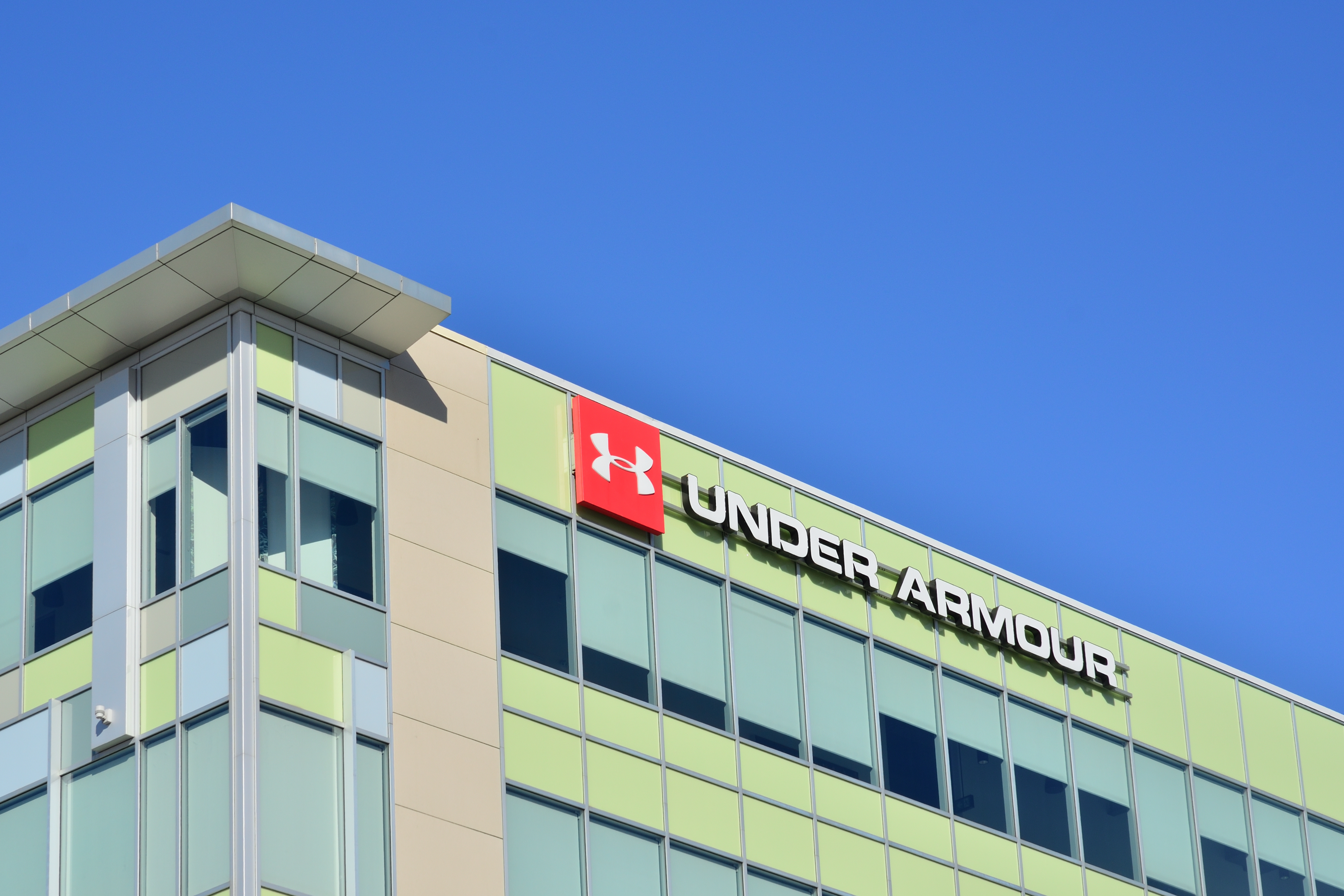
Under Armour's corporate office in Canada

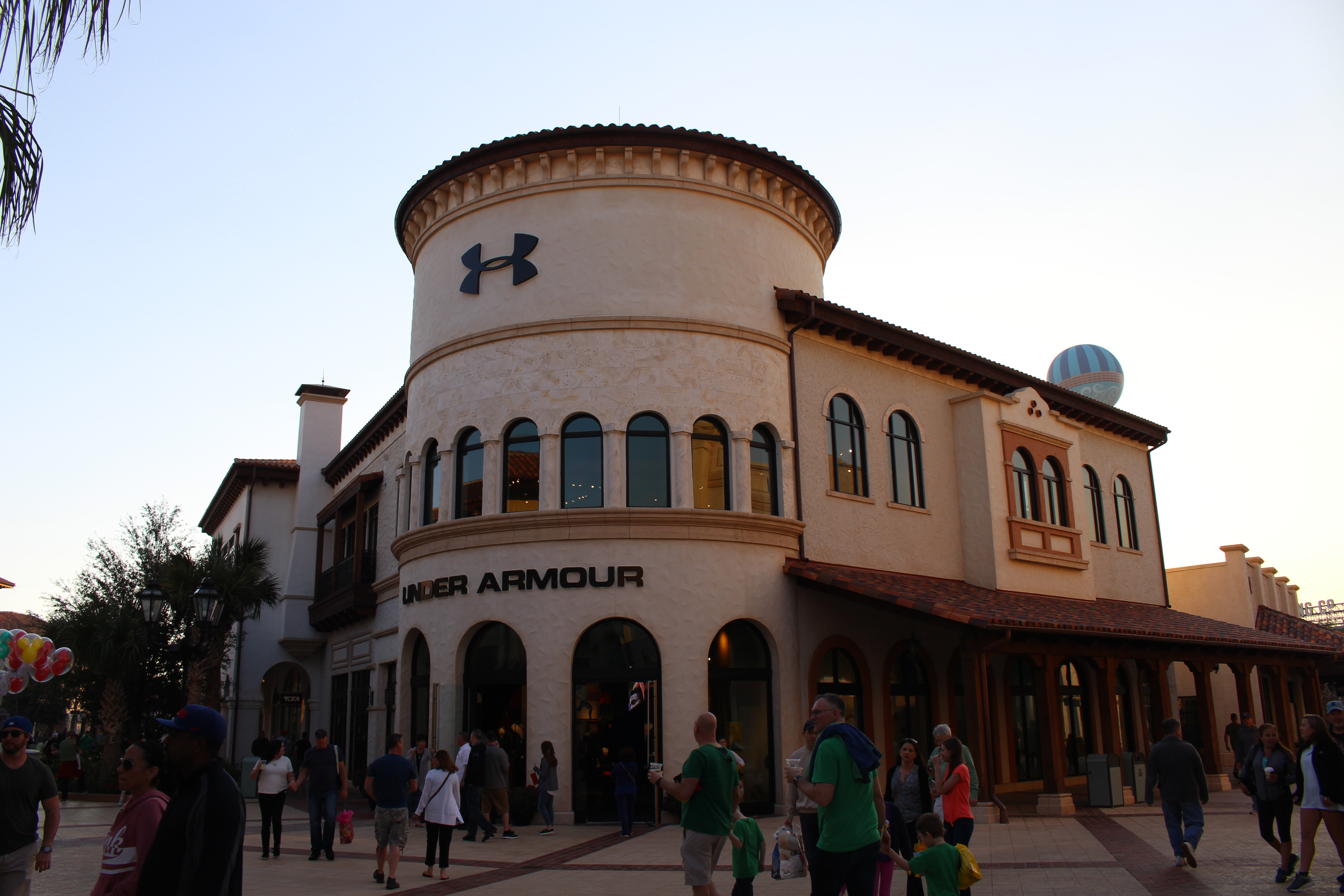
A Brand House at Disney Springs

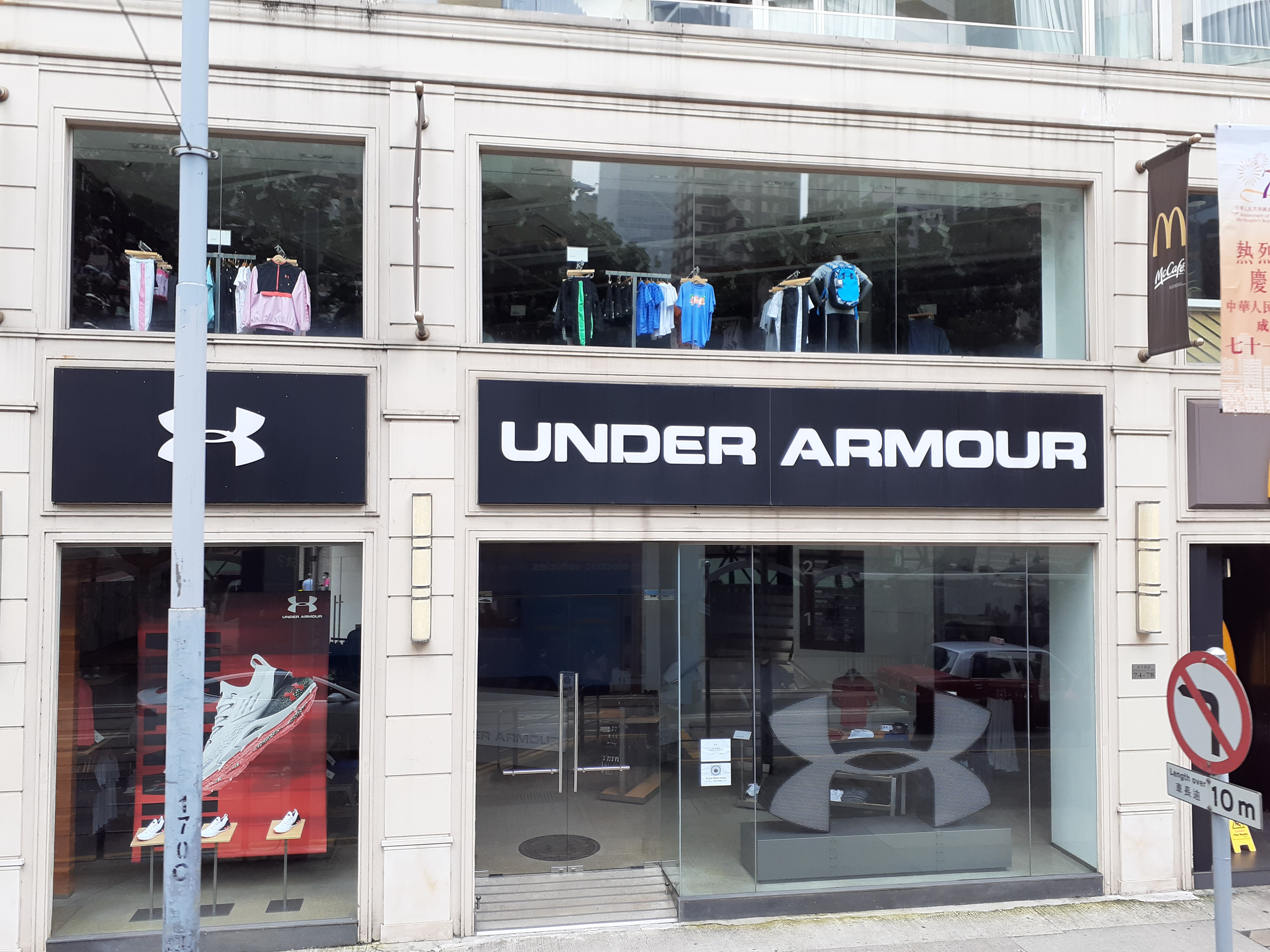
Under Armour's store in Wan Chai, Hong Kong

In 2000, Under Armour became the outfitter of the new XFL football league. In 2003, private equity firm Rosewood Capital invested $12 million into the company. The same year, the company launched its first television commercial, which centered on its motto, "Protect this house." The company had its IPO on the NASDAQ in November 2005, raising $153m of capital. In late 2007, Under Armour opened its first full-line full-price retail location at the Westfield Annapolis mall in Annapolis, Maryland. It has since opened several specialty stores and factory outlet locations in Canada, China, and 39 states including the opening of its first Brand House in Baltimore in 2013 and second Brand House in Tysons, Virginia.

In 2009, the company formed an alliance with Cal Ripken Jr.'s Ripken Baseball, including providing uniforms for the minor league Aberdeen IronBirds and youth teams participating in the Cal Ripken World Series.

The company is reported to be the major commercial sponsor for the reality TV show Duck Dynasty and has garnered attention for taking a stand supporting show "patriarch" Phil Robertson.

Under Armour provided the suits worn by speedskaters in the 2014 Winter Olympics. The US speedskaters were losing while wearing the new Mach 39 speedsuits, but when they reverted to the previous model suits, the skaters continued to lose. Although there did not appear to be a design flaw in the suit that caused the poor results, the news of the suits caused Under Armour stock to drop 2.38%.

The company bid hard over Nike to sign Kevin Durant to an endorsement deal. Offering a reported US$250,000,000 over 10 years. Nike ultimately re-signed Durant after agreeing to structure a contract, offering US$300,000,000.

On January 21, 2014, it was announced that the University of Notre Dame and Under Armour had come to terms with providing uniforms and athletic equipment for the university. This 10-year deal was the largest of its kind in the history of college athletics and became effective July 1, 2014. As of 2014, Under Armour had an operating profit of more than 30%, accelerating from its 2013 pace. The company's share price soared 62.5% that year.

After its November 2013 acquisition of digital app maker MapMyFitness for US$150,000,000, in February 2015 Under Armour announced it had purchased the calorie and nutrition counting app maker MyFitnessPal for $475m, as well as the fitness app maker Endomondo for US$85,000,000.

On January 6, 2016, Under Armour announced a strategic partnership with IBM to use IBM Watson's cognitive computing technology to provide meaningful data from its IOT kit and UA Record app.

In July 2016, Under Armour leased the 53,000-square-foot (4,900 m^{2}) space formerly occupied by FAO Schwarz on New York's Fifth Avenue. FAO Schwarz had been paying $20 million in rent. The store's opening, originally planned for 2019, was pushed back to 2021. Under Armour then announced in March 2021 that it was planning on subleasing approximately half of the overall space.

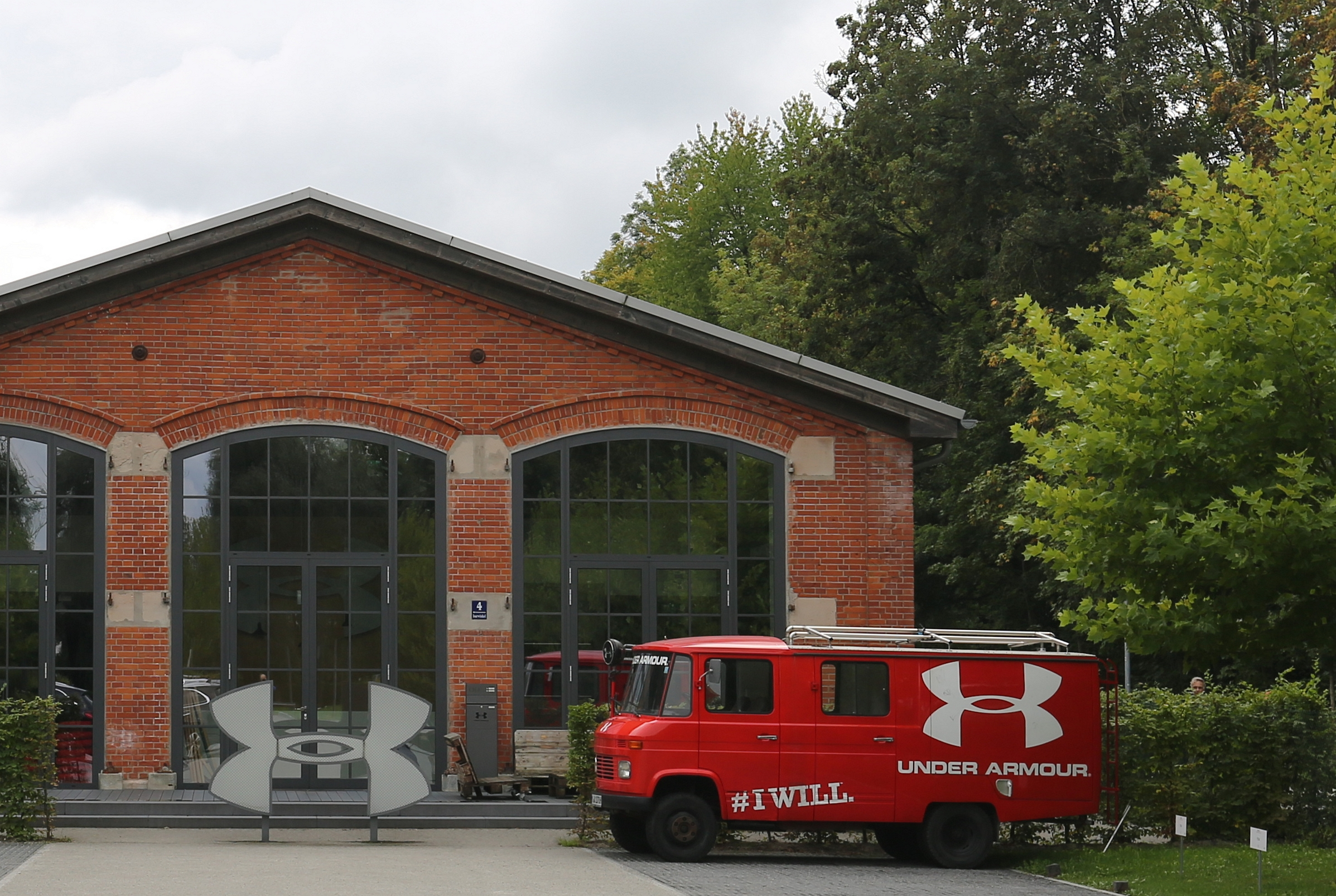
Depot of the Under Armour German subsidiary

On December 5, 2016, Under Armour reached a 10-year agreement with Major League Baseball (MLB) to become its official on-field uniform provider beginning in 2020. Under Armour will replace Majestic, who has been MLB's uniform provider since 2004. However, in May 2018, it was reported that Under Armour would be backing out of the deal with MLB, in order to save the company around $50 million. Nike would instead become the on-field uniform supplier of the league. MLB's deal with Nike became official on January 25, 2019.

In October 2019, Kevin Plank announced he would be stepping down by 2020, and COO Patrik Frisk would succeed him as CEO in January 2020. In July 2020, the company received Wells Notices from the U.S. Securities and Exchange Commission for Mr. Plank, Under Armour's CEO, and David Bergman. The notices are the result of its accounting revelations for the years 2015 and 2016 and "pull forward" sales for the same period. The same month, the company reported revenue decline of 41% for the Q2 of 2020 or $707.6 million. As a result of the COVID-19 pandemic, Under Armour had to close its physical stores earlier that same year. Despite the revenue decline, it still fared better than the analytic predictions, which had previously estimated profits of $541 million in sales for Q2.

Effective September 11, 2023, Under Armour appointed John Varvatos as chief design officer; Varvatos held the position until his departure in November 2025.

Effective April 1, 2024, Kevin Plank returned to the company as CEO, replacing Stephanie Linnartz who served in this position a little more than a year.

== Finances ==
Under Armour's global headquarters are located in Baltimore, Maryland, with additional offices located in Amsterdam (European headquarters), Austin, Guangzhou, Hong Kong, Houston, Jakarta, London, Mexico City, Munich, New York City, Panama City (international headquarters), Paris, Pittsburgh, Portland, San Francisco, São Paulo, Santiago, Seoul, Shanghai (Greater Chinese headquarters), and Toronto.

For the fiscal year 2018, Under Armour reported losses of US$46 million, with annual revenue of US$4.977 billion, an increase of 9.9% over the previous fiscal cycle. Under Armour's market capitalization was valued at over US$10.7 billion in November 2018.

Year	Revenue in mil. US$	Net income in mil. US$	Total assets in mil. US$
2005	281	14	204
2006	431	39	289
2007	607	52	391
2008	725	38	488
2009	856	46	546
2010	1,064	68	675
2011	1,473	96	919
2012	1,835	129	1,157
2013	2,332	162	1,578
2014	3,084	208	2,095
2015	3,963	233	2,866
2016	4,833	198	3,644
2017	4,989	-48	4,006
2018	4,977	−46	4,245
2019	5,267	92	4,843

=== Sales ===
In 2014, sales of apparel, footwear and accessories represented 74.3%, 14% and 9.9% of net revenues, respectively. Revenue has grown steadily by 30% from 2010 to 2014. As of January 28, 2016, the fourth quarter net revenues for 2015 increased 31% to $1.17 Billion while the full year net revenues increased 28% to $3.96 Billion. Based on these numbers, Under Armour has updated its 2016 net revenues outlook to approximately $4.95 Billion (+25%).

== Products ==
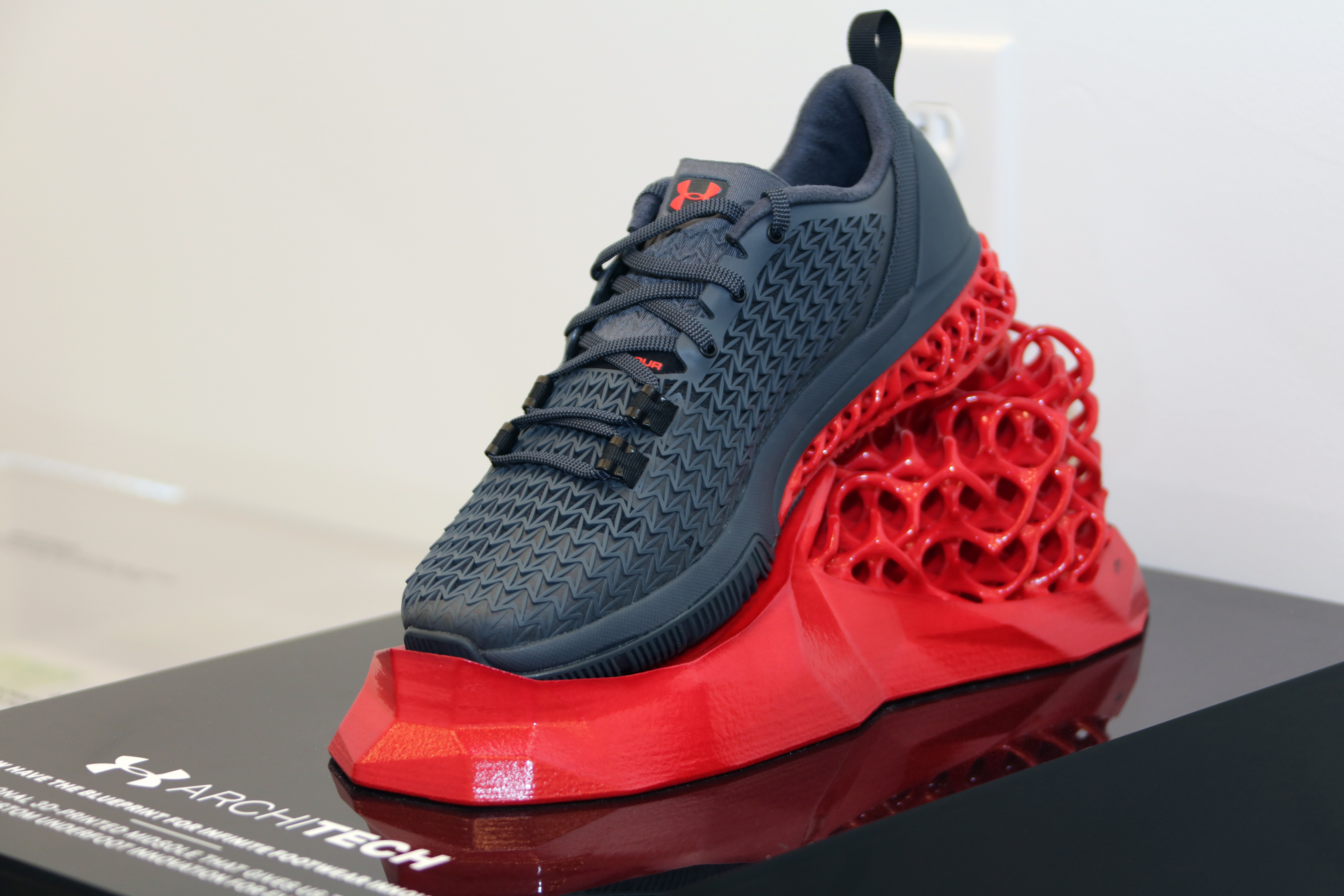
UA ArchiTech shoes

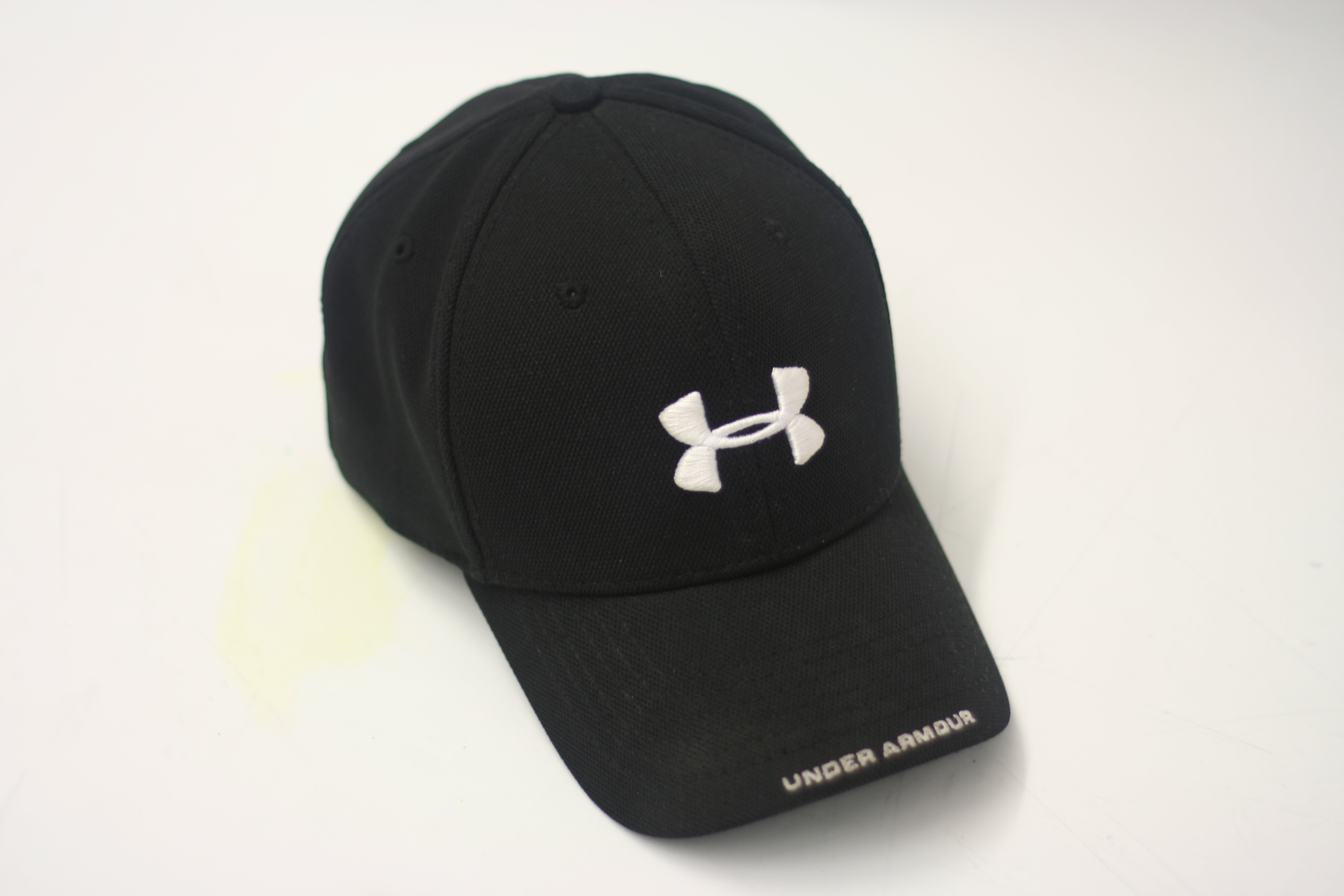
UA cap

Products manufactured by Under Armour include athletic shoes, t-shirts, jackets, hoodies, pants, leggings, shorts, athletic bras, athletic bags, face masks and accessories such as bags, gloves, caps and protective gear. Under Armour also produces American football, basketball and soccer uniforms, among other sports.

The expansion of Under Armour's product lines, such as TurfGear, AllseasonGear, and StreetGear put Under Armour at the forefront of the emerging performance apparel industry. In 2003, Under Armour launched its Women's Performance Gear product line.

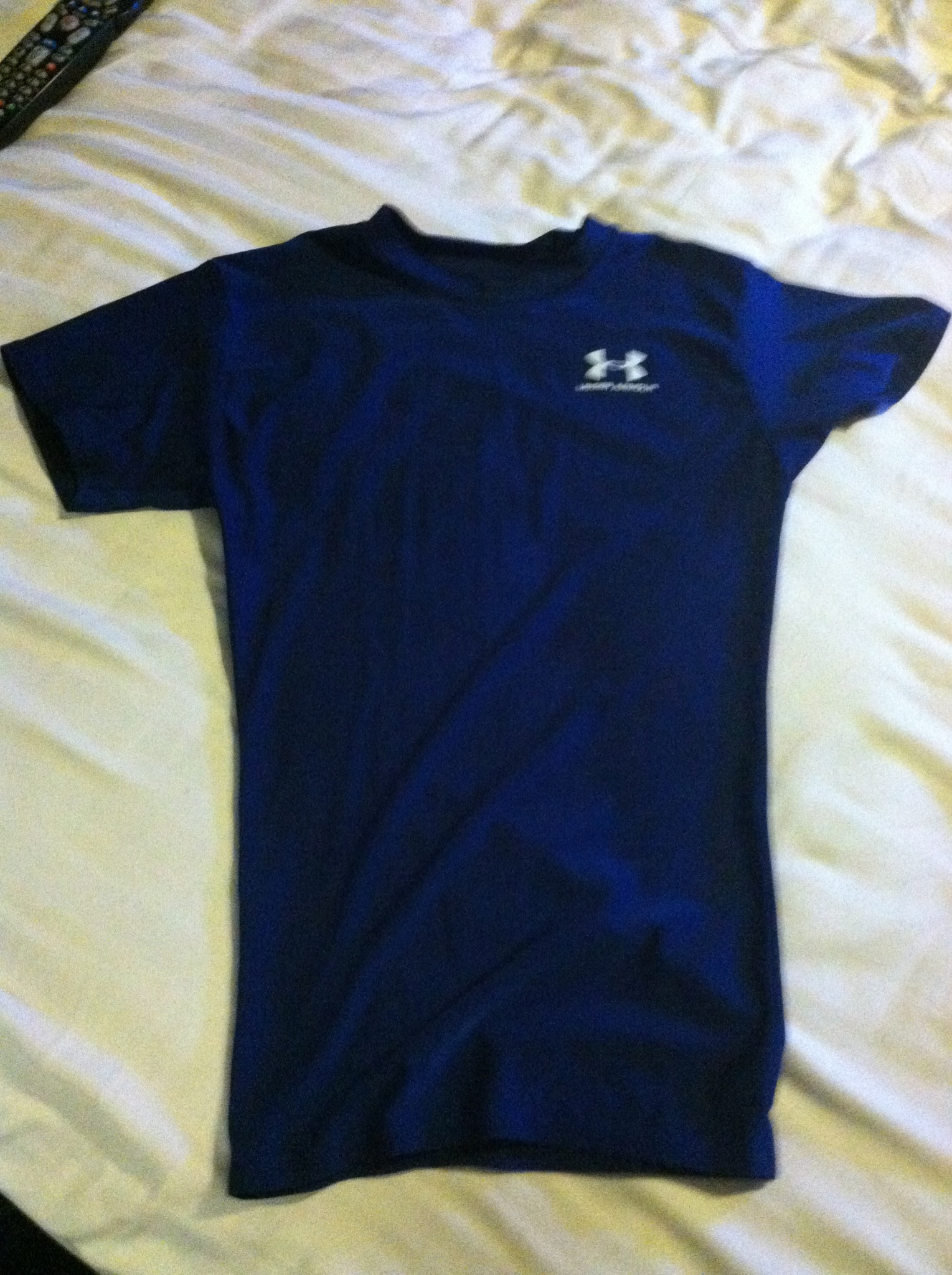
An Under Armour t-shirt

Under Armour announced an addition to their ColdGear product line, called Infrared, that was released in 2013. This line claims to dissipate and re-circulate heat around the wearer's body using ceramic powder. This was purportedly designed so that the wearer's heat signature will not be picked up. Under Armour also had released a product with scent control technology in 2012 titled, "Under Armour Scent Control". This line claims to be designed so that the wearer's scent cannot be detected.

Under Armour developed a new type of shirt called "Coldblack", which is designed to reflect heat and keep athletes cool in the sun. Under Armour has come out with new styles for football uniforms. In October 2012, Under Armour created "The Wounded Warrior" project for football uniforms. The University of Hawaii and Boston College wore the star-studded cleats and the American striped jerseys. They were revealed when Boston College played Maryland on October 27, 2012, also when Hawaii played UNLV on November 24, 2012.

The company produces the Speedform shoe in a Chinese bra factory. It has no insole and little stitching. Shoes are Under Armour's fastest growing product line, growing 31% from 2011 to $239 million in sales in 2012.

In 2018, Under Armour launched two new pairs of connected running shoes at CES. Inside each shoe is a Bluetooth module, accelerometer and gyroscope.

In November 2020, Under Armour announced a new brand in partnership with NBA star Stephen Curry called the Curry Brand. The launch follows Under Armour's quarterly earnings, resulting in $1.43 billion in revenue, which was flat in comparison to 2019.

=== Recalls ===
On April 29, 2009, the United States Consumer Product Safety Commission announced a voluntary recall of all Under Armour brand athletic cups. The cups might break when hit, posing a risk of serious injury. They were sold from January 2006 to March 2009. On November 3, 2011, the CPSC announced a voluntary recall of all Under Armour Defender chin straps. The straps pose a laceration hazard when a player contacts the metal snap. They were sold from January 2008 to September 2011.

== Marketing and sponsorships ==
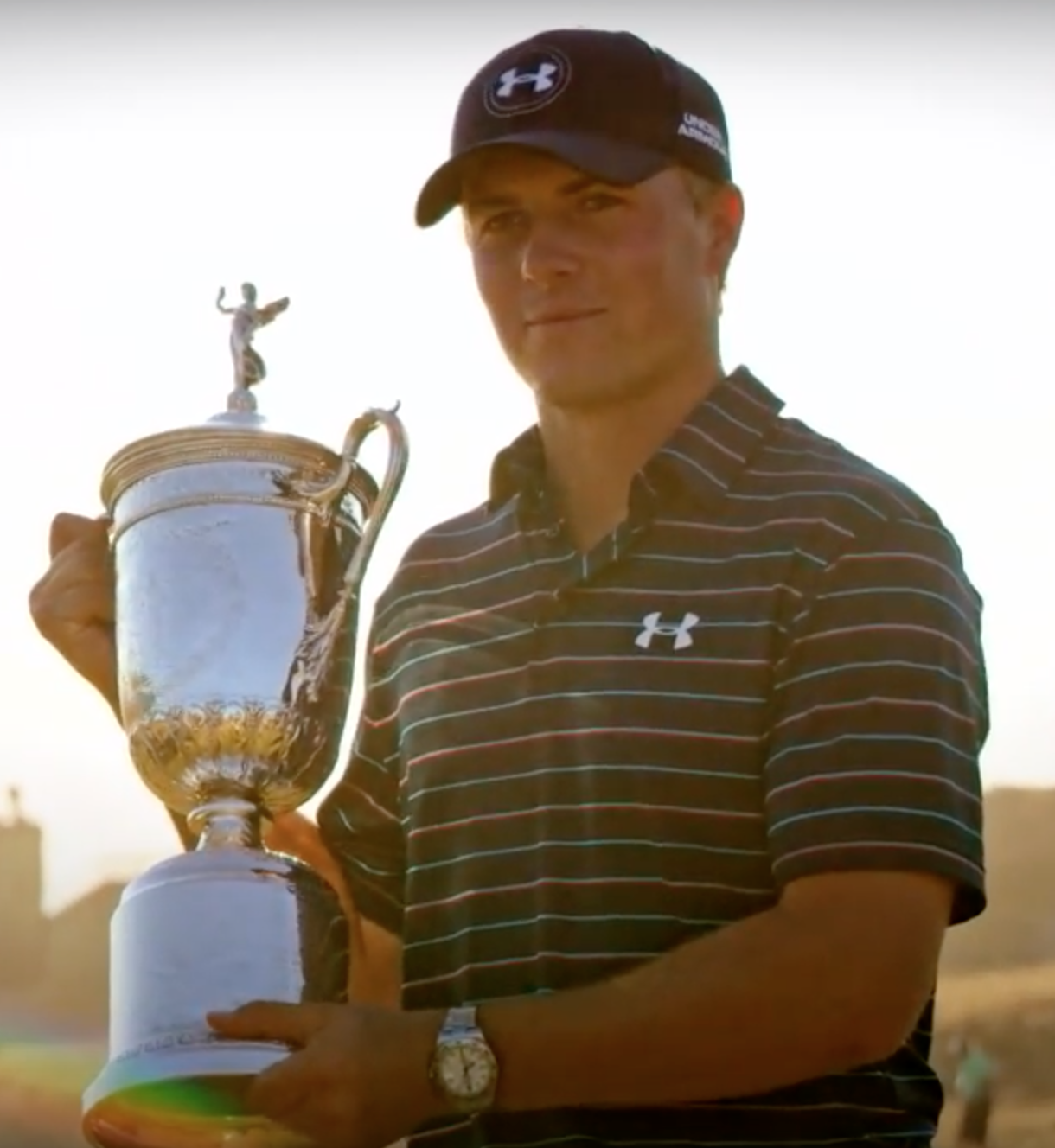
Jordan Spieth wearing Under Armour golf gear

Under Armour promotes its products by sponsorship agreements with athletes, celebrities, and sports teams, a field in which it competes with other sports apparel companies. One of its most fiscally beneficial marketing strategies has been its collaboration with actor Dwayne Johnson, who has endorsed the company since January 2016.

Under Armour has a partnership with PGA Tour player Jordan Spieth who it signed an endorsement with in 2013. Spieth has won three majors to date (the 2015 Masters, the 2015 U.S. Open and the 2017 Open Championship) and has launched his own golf shoe, "Spieth One".

Under Armour has worked with Hollywood to boost its profile. Its product placement dates to the 1999 sports drama Any Given Sunday, and has since included Friday Night Lights (2004), The Blind Side (2009), The Dark Knight Rises (2012), Lone Survivor (2013), The Martian (2015), and television series The Wire and House of Cards. Under Armour worked with costume designer Alexandra Byrne to create base-layer garments for characters in several films in the Marvel Cinematic Universe.

Under Armour has a partnership with NBA athlete Stephen Curry, who is considered to be the "face of their footwear line". Originally signed to Nike, Curry joined with Under Armour in the 2013 offseason. As Curry became a two-time NBA Most Valuable Player Award winner and one of the most popular athletes in the world, sales of his shoes have become a major factor for the Under Armour brand, with stock prices rising and falling based on the success of the Curry shoe line.

On March 3, 2016, the company became the Official Match Ball Partner of the North American Soccer League, starting with their 2016 season. In May, Under Armour and UCLA announced plans for a 15-year, $280 million contract, making this the largest shoe and apparel sponsorship in NCAA history.

On October 10, 2018, Under Armour announced that it has signed Philadelphia 76ers center Joel Embiid to a sneaker endorsement deal.

In December 2024, Under Armour announced its sponsorship of Unrivaled, the women’s 3x3 basketball league founded by Napheesa Collier and Breanna Stewart, serving as the league's "official uniform partner and performance outfitter" for the inaugural 2025 season.

Japanese idol group SixTones member Jesse was appointed as brand ambassador for Under Armour Japan, as announced on March 24, 2025.

=== American football ===
==== Leagues and associations ====
- National Football League (NFL) – Official footwear and glove partner
- United Football League (UFL) – Founding corporate partner, providing uniforms, sideline apparel, and performance gear

==== National teams ====
- (United States) USA Football – Official uniform, apparel, and football sponsor for U.S. Flag football at the Summer Olympics, debuting at the 2028 Summer Olympics

==== NFL players ====
- Luther Burden III
- Nick Emmanwori
- Matthew Golden
- Tyler Booker
- Justin Jefferson
- Cam Ward

=== Baseball ===
==== MLB players ====
- Alec Bohm
- Freddie Freeman
- Bryce Harper
- Gunnar Henderson
- Juan Soto
- Bobby Witt Jr

=== Basketball ===
==== Leagues and associations ====
- Unrivaled – Official uniform partner and performance outfitter for the women’s 3x3 basketball league

==== NBA players ====
- Seth Curry
- Stephen Curry – Had a long-term partnership with Under Armour until 2026, including the Curry Brand line of shoes and apparel
- De'Aaron Fox
- Davion Mitchell

==== Women's basketball ====
- Laeticia Amihere
- Haley Cavinder
- Hanna Cavinder
- Kaila Charles
- MiLaysia Fulwiley
- Cayla George
- Raven Johnson
- Marina Mabrey
- Diamond Miller
- Nika Mühl
- Kelsey Plum

=== Combat sports ===
==== Boxing ====
- Anthony Joshua

==== Mixed Martial Arts (MMA) ====
- UFC – Official footwear supplier through Project Rock, providing performance shoes for UFC fighters' training and promotional use

==== Professional wrestling ====
- Bullet Club
- Dwayne "The Rock" Johnson – Has a long-term partnership with Under Armour, including the "Project Rock" line of training gear and apparel.
- Drew McIntyre

=== Collegiate athletics ===
==== Leagues and associations ====
- Horizon League – Official athletic apparel and footwear partner for the collegiate athletic conference, providing performance gear for all member teams

==== FBS ====
- Coastal Carolina Chanticleers
- Georgia Tech Yellow Jackets
- Georgia State Panthers
- Kent State Golden Flashes
- Maryland Terrapins
- Navy Midshipmen
- North Dakota State Bison
- Notre Dame Fighting Irish
- Northwestern Wildcats
- Old Dominion Monarchs
- Sam Houston Bearkats
- San Jose State Spartans
- UAB Blazers
- UMass Minutemen
- Utah Utes
- Wisconsin Badgers

==== FCS ====
- Abilene Christian Wildcats
- Albany Great Danes
- Austin Peay Governors
- Campbell Fighting Camels
- Charleston Cougars
- Colgate Raiders
- The Citadel Bulldogs
- Davidson Wildcats
- Elon Phoenix
- Fairleigh Dickinson Knights
- Gardner-Webb Runnin' Bulldogs
- Hampton Pirates
- Houston Christian Huskies
- Indiana State Sycamores
- Jackson State Tigers
- Lamar Cardinals
- Lehigh Mountain Hawks
- Long Island Sharks
- McNeese State Cowboys
- Mercer Bears
- Monmouth Hawks
- Montana State Bobcats
- Morehead State Eagles
- Morgan State Bears
- Northern Colorado Bears
- Northwestern State Demons
- Robert Morris Colonials
- Saint Francis Red Flash
- South Dakota State Jackrabbits
- Southeast Missouri State Redhawks
- Southeastern Louisiana Lions
- Southern Jaguars
- Southern Illinois Salukis
- Stephen F. Austin Lumberjacks
- Texas Southern Tigers
- Towson Tigers
- UT Martin Skyhawks
- UT Rio Grande Valley Vaqueros
- VMI Keydets
- Wagner Seahawks
- William & Mary Tribe
- Yale Bulldogs

==== Non–football ====
- Boston University Terriers
- Cal State Bakersfield Roadrunners
- Cal State Northridge Matadors
- Denver Pioneers
- Lipscomb Bisons
- North Florida Ospreys
- Queens University Royals
- Saint Mary's Gaels
- Seton Hall Pirates
- UNC Wilmington Seahawks
- UC San Diego Tritons
- UT Arlington Mavericks

==== Leagues and associations ====
- Central Intercollegiate Athletic Association (CIAA) – Renewed partnership for men’s and women’s basketball tournament apparel

==== Teams ====
- Bloomsburg Huskies
- Ferris State Bulldogs
- Florida Southern College Moccasins
- Flagler College Saints
- Mount Olive Trojans

==== NCAA Division III (D3) ====
- Eastern Mennonite Royals
- Hartford Hawks
- Holy Cross College
- Illinois Wesleyan University
- Mount Holyoke College
- North Park University
- Sarah Lawrence College
- Whittier College
- Wilkes University

==== Other ====
- Keiser University Seahawks
- Toronto Varsity Blues

=== Golf ===
- Maverick McNealy
- Kris Kim
- Christo Lamprecht
- Rasmus Neergaard-Petersen
- Emily Pedersen
- Jordan Spieth
- Kieron van Wyk

=== Hockey ===
==== Leagues and associations ====
- Canadian Hockey League (CHL) – Exclusive jersey, socks, training footwear, and apparel partner starting with the 2025-26 season

==== NHL players ====
- Drew Doughty
- Phil Kessel
- Cale Makar
- Carey Price

=== Winter Olympics ===
==== National teams ====
- (United States) U.S. Speedskating Team
- (United States) U.S. Bobsled and Skeleton Teams
- (Nigeria) Nigerian Women's Bobsled Team

==== Athletes ====
- Lindsey Vonn
- Marcel Hirscher

=== Rugby league ===
- Canberra Raiders

== Controversies ==
=== UA Fitness Performance Center and historic mural covering ===
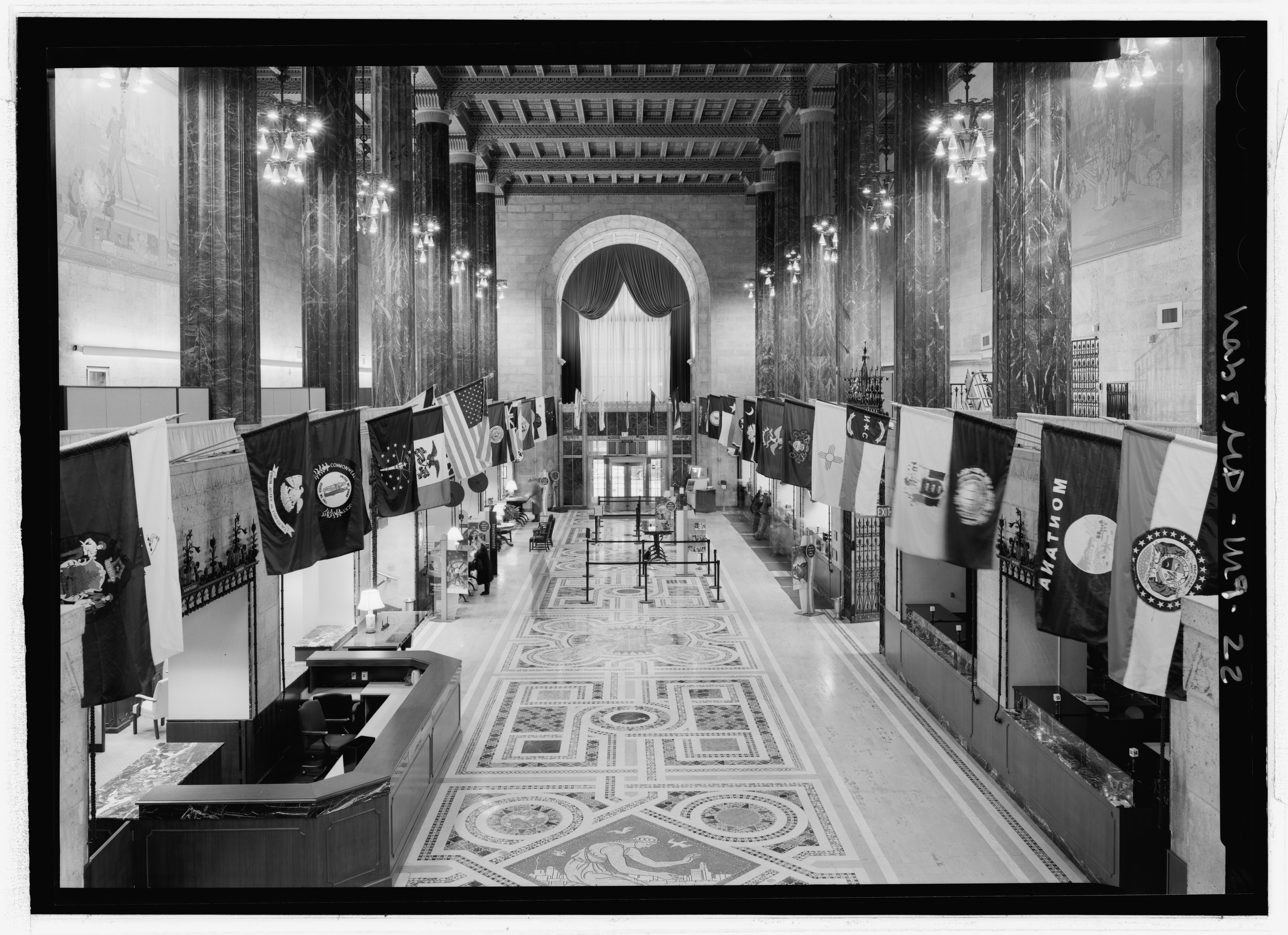
The historic lobby floor, pictured in 1933, now covered by artificial turf for the Under Armour Fitness Performance Center

In 2015, Under Armour released plans for its new Under Armour Fitness Performance Center powered by FX Studios at the Bank of America Building at 10 Light Street in Baltimore. The Fitness Performance Center is planned to take place in the building's lobby, covering historic murals of Baltimore's history by art deco artist Hildreth Meiere with artificial turf flooring. This plan has been seen as controversial due to the fact that Kevin Plank, Nate Costa (president of FX Studios) and developer Cary Euwer used state and federal tax credits to restore the historical building, yet the historical murals are being covered up by turf flooring. Many historians and local Baltimoreans have expressed public outcry that the design should be reconsidered and the murals should be saved.

=== Trophy hunting video ===
In January 2016 Under Armour initiated a marketing campaign featuring women hunters including an American woman named Sarah Bowmar. In August 2016 a video filmed by Bowmar, showing her husband spearing a bear and then rejoicing that he had hit it, went viral. The bear was found dead the next day. Under Armour was heavily criticized worldwide and as result, the company ended its contract with Bowmar a few days after the video became known.

=== Trump endorsement and public boycott ===
On February 7, 2017, two weeks into the presidency of Donald Trump, CEO Kevin Plank expressed his support for the administration and its friendliness to corporations.

Numerous athletes contracted with Under Armour also spoke out in opposition to Plank's statements. Stephen Curry, the most valuable of the company's sponsorships, hinted that his loyalty to the company could be jeopardized if its actions do not reflect his values. Dwayne Johnson voiced disapproval with the CEO's personal attitudes being reflected onto the company's partners and employees.

On February 15, eight days following Plank's statements, Plank took out a full-page ad in the Baltimore Sun to clarify his position and that of the company. The letter acknowledged that he had used "a choice of words that did not accurately reflect my intent" and described how his company valued diversity, entrepreneurship and job creation. He condemned the administration's ban on travel to and from seven primarily Muslim nations, adding "we will join a coalition of companies in opposition to any new actions that negatively impact our team, their families or our community."

In a statement issued to reporters on June 2, Plank deplored the Trump Administration's decision to withdraw the United States from the Paris Agreement:

We at Under Armour are disappointed by the Administration's decision to withdraw from the Paris Climate Agreement as climate change continues to threaten our planet, our cities and our economies. Climate change is real and must be taken seriously by our business community, our customers, our neighbors and our elected officials. Sustainability has always been part of our DNA: it's integral to how we live and work and is essential to our environment. As a business leader concerned with creating American jobs, I disagree with the decision to exit the Paris accord.

On August 14, 2017, Plank removed himself from Trump's Manufacturing Jobs Initiative Council, following backlash over Trump's response to the events in Charlottesville, Virginia.

=== Fireproofing and flammability ===
In June 2018 a Facebook post emerged stating that Under Armour clothing was flammable and resulted in severe burn injuries to a child. Though no recall was issued and no evidence suggests the brand's items were not in compliance with federal regulations, a 2008 study by the United States Forest Service found that Under Armour's material was more likely to result in a burn injury of the wearer than most other undergarment materials.

=== Federal probe ===
In November 2019, the U.S. Securities and Exchange Commission made public that Under Armour's accounting policies had been under scrutiny for more than two years. In July 2020, the company confirmed that the U.S. Securities and Exchange Commission had sent Wells Notices relating to Under Armour's accounting in 2015 and 2016.

== Community involvement ==
UA Give Back is Under Armour's effort to become involved in different facets of the world community. It has different branches in its organization that specialize in each cause that Under Armour supports. They consist of the UA Power in Pink, UA Freedom and UA Win Global.

UA Power in Pink is an Under Armour program that promotes women using exercise and fitness to fight breast cancer. UA Freedom is an Under Armour program that supports the efforts of the Wounded Warrior Project whose mission is to honor, raise awareness, and aid wounded veterans and military service members. UA Win Global is a children's athletics program which focuses on "underserved communities" by enhancing play areas, investing in sports programs and providing support for sports coaches.

As of 2012, Under Armour was the sponsor of the Baseball Factory's "Premium Video Program", which holds more than 100 events for youth athletes across the United States annually.

After ads of many brands ran on extremist channels promoting extremist content on YouTube, Under Armour pulled its ad from Alphabet Inc. owned YouTube.

== See also ==
- Under Armour All-America Baseball Game
- Under Armour All-America Game
