= Kieron van Wyk =

South African professional golfer (born 2002)

Personal information
- Nationality: South Africa
- Born: 15 January 2002 (age 24) Ruimsig, South Africa.
- Height: 6 ft 2 in (188 cm)

Career
- Sport: Golf
- College: College of Charleston
- Turned professional: 2025
- Current tours: Korn Ferry Tour; Sunshine Tour

Achievements and awards
- CAA Player of the Year: 2022, 2023, 2025
- Adrian Stills Award: 2022

Kieron van Wyk (born 15 January 2002) is a South African professional golfer. He played collegiately at the College of Charleston, where he became the first three-time CAA Player of the Year in history, and the first Black player to win the CAA Individual Championship in 2022.

== Early life ==
Van Wyk was born on 15 January 2002, in Ruimsig, South Africa and attended Curro Aurora High School. As a freshman he helped lead the school's golf team to a South African High School Championship in 2018.

== Amateur career ==
After back-to-back runner up finishes in South African Stroke Play and the African Amateur Championships, van Wyk was invited to represent South Africa at the 2021 Spirit International. He, along with captain and teammate Christo Lamprecht, led South Africa to finish eighth overall and fifth in the men's event.

Van Wyk enrolled at the College of Charleston and started playing with he Charleston Cougars golf team, where as a freshman in 2022 he recorded one of the best seasons in program history. He won his first collegiate tournament, the Schenkel Invitational, on 20 March 2022, after posting a career-best round of 66 on the first day of play. On 26 April 2022, van Wyk won the CAA Championship by shooting 13 under par, tying the conference's tournament record. He became the first Black player to ever win the CAA Championship, and was named CAA Player of the Year at the conclusion of the season. His top-5 finish at the NCAA Regional in Palm Springs, Florida allowed the Cougars to advance to the NCAA Championship for the first time since 2001. After the season van Wyk was presented with the inaugural Adrian Stills Award for the Black College Golfer of the Year.

On 14 June 2023, van Wyk won the Harry Oppenheimer Trophy at the Maccauvlei Golf Club in Vereeniging, South Africa. On 11 October 2023, van Wyk won the Bank of Tennessee Intercollegiate Invitational in Jonesborough, Tennessee. He was named CAA Player of the Year for the second year in a row, and finished tied for 48th individually at the NCAA Regional in Salem, South Carolina.

On 23 April 2024, van Wyk won his second CAA Championship title by shooting 13 under par, once again tying the conference's tournament record. He finished 50th individually at the NCAA Regional in West Lafayette, Indiana. On 27 October 2024, van Wyk won the White Sands Bahamas Men’s Golf Invitational after finishing 21 strokes under par, a new tournament record, resulting in an invitation to the 2025 Puerto Rico Open.

On 26 January 2025, van Wyk debuted on the APGA Tour and won the Farmers Insurance Invitational at the historic Torrey Pines Golf Course, making him the first amateur to win an APGA event since the tour's creation in 2010. van Wyk made his PGA Tour debut in the 2025 Puerto Rico Open at the Grand Reserve Golf Club in Rio Grande, having earned a spot through winning the 2024 White Sands Bahamas Invitational. He made the cut, and despite entering the final day of play in second place, finished tied for fourth place overall. After finishing in the top 10 of the Puerto Rico open, van Wyk was invited to his second PGA Tour event, the 2025 Valspar Championship, where he missed the cut. On 25 March 2025, van Wyk won the Hootie at Bulls Bay Invitational.

After shooting one-under-par for a 12th place individually at the NCAA Regional in Auburn, Alabama, and finishing the season ranked No. 27 among collegiate golfers, van Wyk became the first player in history to be named CAA Player of the Year three separate times. He was also named to the All-American Third Team by the GCAA, making him the first All-American golfer in program history.

== Professional career ==
Kieron van Wyk made his Korn Ferry Tour debut in May 2025, as he shot +2 over par to miss the cut at the UNC Health Championship.

== Awards and honors ==
- 3× CAA Golfer of the Year (2022, 2023, 2025)
- 2× CAA Champion (2022, 2024)
- 4× All-CAA First Team (2022–2025)
- GCAA All-American Third Team (2025)
- BCGCA Adrian Stills Award (2022)

== Personal life ==
Kieron van Wyk's older sibling is also a professional golfer who plays on the Sunshine Tour in South Africa. His favorite golfer is Tiger Woods.

== Amateur wins ==
- 2022 Schenkel Invitational, CAA Championship
- 2023 Harry Oppenheimer Trophy, Bank of Tennessee Intercollegiate
- 2024 CAA Championship, White Sands Bahamas Collegiate
- 2025 APGA Farmers Insurance Invitational, Hootie Intercollegiate

== Team appearances ==
- Spirit International (representing South Africa): 2021
