= Li-Ning =

Chinese sportswear and equipment company

Li-Ning Company Limited
- Native name: 李宁有限公司
- Type: Public
- Traded as: SEHK: 2331
- Industry: Sportswear and sports equipment
- Founded: 1990; 36 years ago
- Headquarters: Beijing, China (global headquarters); Cayman Islands (legal domicile)
- Area served: Worldwide
- Key people: Li Ning (Founder & Chairman); Terence Tsang (CFO); Dom Kwok
- Products: Athletic shoes, apparel, sports equipment, accessories
- Revenue: CN¥ 29,598 million (FY 2025)
- Net income: CN¥ 2,936 million (FY 2025)
- Website: lining.com

Li-Ning Co., Ltd.
- Simplified Chinese: 李宁有限公司
- Traditional Chinese: 李寧有限公司
Transcriptions
Standard Mandarin
- Hanyu Pinyin: Lǐníng Yǒuxiàn Gōngsī

Li-Ning Company Limited is a Chinese sportswear and sports equipment company founded by former Olympic gymnast Li Ning. The company endorses a number of international athletes and teams.

== History ==
The company was founded in 1990 by Li Ning, a former Chinese Olympic gymnast. As of 2026, Li Ning remained the chairman of the company's board of directors. In 2005, Li-Ning created a joint-venture with French sports apparel company, AIGLE, giving Li-Ning the exclusive right to be the sole distributor of AIGLE's products in China for 50 years. In 2006, Li-Ning posted revenues of US$418 million, and total profits of about US$39 million. As of March 2007, there were 4,297 Li-Ning retail stores. The company directly owns some of the retail stores while others are franchised.

In January 2010, Li-Ning opened its U.S. headquarters and flagship store in Portland, Oregon. In 2010, as part of the 'Revitalization' of the brand, Li-Ning released a new logo and the new slogan "让改变发生" "Ràng Gǎibiàn Fāshēng" in Chinese, translated to "Make the Change Occur" in English. In January 2011, Li-Ning entered into a partnership with Chicago-based Acquity Group to expand its U.S. distribution and brand awareness.

In October 2012, Li-Ning signed into a partnership with NBA player Dwyane Wade.

In 2013, The Group recorded revenue of RMB2,906 million, which represented a decrease of 24.6% year-on-year, due to near-term focus on sell-in reductions, inventory clearance, and reducing the number of stores. The Group projected a net loss of up to 820 million yuan (US$13.19 million) for 2014, the third straight year where it was unprofitable.

In 2019, Li-Ning reported revenues increased by 32 percent and reached 13.87 billion yuan against 10.51 billion yuan a year ago. Net profit attributable to equity holders increased to ¥1.5 billion from ¥715.3 million which vaulted 110 percent.

In 2020, Li-Ning saw its revenue increase 4.2 percent year-on-year to 14.46 billion yuan ($2.22 billion), the net profit increased on a comparative basis by 34.2 percent to 1.7 billion yuan ($261 million).

On 7 March 2022, the world's largest sovereign wealth fund, the Government Pension Fund of Norway excluded and divested from Li-Ning. The reason for this exclusion was an "unacceptable risk that the company contributes to serious human rights violations". That same month, the US Customs & Border Protection began detaining Li-Ning products from entering American soil due to the company using North Korean labor in its supply chain, causing them to withdraw from the US market.

The company's production facilities have been linked to human rights abuses against Uyghurs.

In June 2026, Li-Ning entered into a long-term partnership with NBA player Stephen Curry and his Curry Brand. The agreement included basketball footwear and apparel, athleisure products, a golf line, and the ability for Curry to sign athletes under the Curry Brand banner. The deal was intended to expand Curry Brand's global presence.

== Marketing ==
The company has used sponsorship deals, particularly with athletes and sports teams, both in China and abroad, to raise its profile.

In 2006, the company entered strategic collaborations with the National Basketball Association, the Association of Tennis Professionals, the Chinese University Basketball Association, and the Chinese Football Association. It also signed sponsorship deals with the Chinese national teams and the Sudan track and field team. The company would also provide apparel for the Argentina national basketball team at international events including the 2008 Summer Olympics and 2012 Summer Olympics. A similar deal was made with the Swedish Olympic Committee.

Indian Olympic Association had signed a sponsorship deal with Li Ning for the Rio 2016 Summer Olympics.

In celebration of its 30th anniversary, the brand held a fashion show on January 18, 2020, during Paris menswear fashion week. The show also showcased a 10-piece capsule collection in collaboration with Jackie Chan and a sneaker done up with Dwyane Wade.

== 2008 Beijing Olympics ==
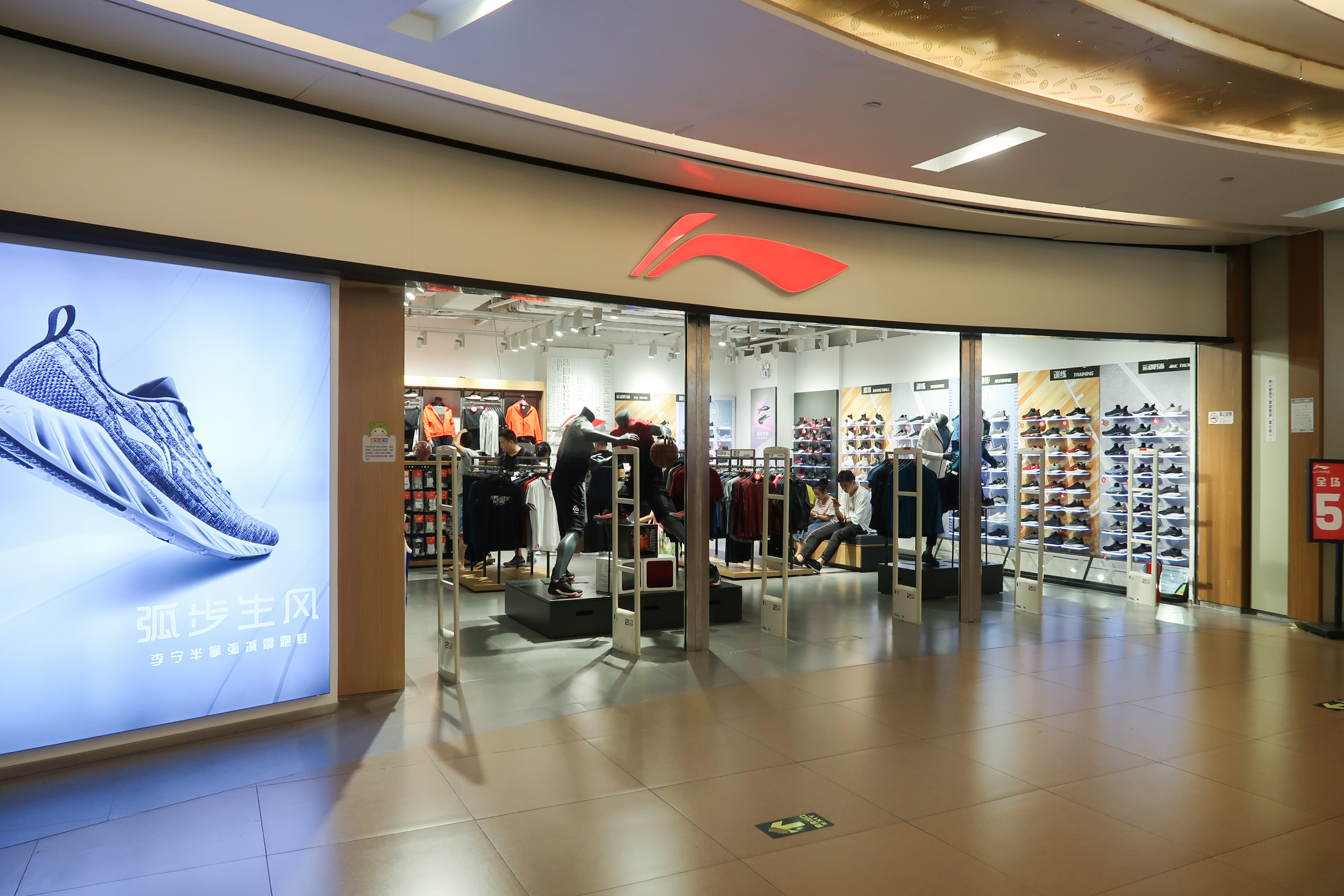
Li Ning in Bingo Space

Li-Ning sought sponsorship opportunities related to the 2008 Summer Olympics held in Beijing, China. In 2007, Li-Ning entered into a strategic partnership with CCTV-5, the sports channel of the Chinese Central Television, to provide apparel for its hosts, news presenters and reporters through the end of 2008, including broadcasts during the Beijing Olympic Games. Li-Ning also sponsored the Chinese national teams of Gymnastics, Table Tennis, Shooting and Diving. It also sponsored the Argentine basketball team, as well as the Spanish and Swedish Olympics teams.

In a now famous case of ambush marketing (a subset of guerilla marketing), when entire countries were tuned to the 2008 Summer Olympics opening ceremony, millions saw Li Ning light the torch. Though the Li-Ning company was not an official sponsor of the games, it had still associated itself with the games through its role as an equipment supplier for several Chinese Olympic teams, and through Li's status as a Chinese sports and business icon. Consequently, the ceremony generated tremendous exposure for Li's eponymous company to the chagrin of official sports apparel supplier Adidas, as viewers did not realize that he had been fully dressed in Adidas as per its sponsorship rights to the Games. The company's share price increased by over 3% on the first day of trading after the opening ceremony.

== Sponsorship ==
Li-Ning was an official marketing partner of the National Basketball Association and has/had sponsorship deals with ten players: Baron Davis (retired), Shaquille O'Neal (retired), Damon Jones (retired), José Calderón (retired), Cleanthony Early of the Rio Grande Valley Vipers, Glenn Robinson III of the Golden State Warriors, Evan Turner of the Atlanta Hawks, Dwyane Wade of the Miami Heat (lifetime contract), and CJ McCollum of the New Orleans Pelicans.

In 2006, O'Neal signed a four-year deal with Li-Ning, reportedly worth US$1.25 million, the largest deal made by the company, and the highest profile signing of an American sports star by a Chinese company. O'Neal cited former teammate Damon Jones and the Spanish national basketball team's deal with Li-Ning as influences on his decision to sign with Li-Ning.

Previously, Li-Ning also operated as shirt sponsor for the Vietnam national football team from 2006 to 2008, which saw Vietnam's prominent rise to successes in 2007 AFC Asian Cup and 2008 AFF Championship.

In 2010, Li-Ning became the official shirt sponsor for Tajikistan's tennis team, as well as for FC Istiklol.

In 2012, Dwyane Wade left the Jordan Brand for Li-Ning. The deal was worth $10 million.

In 2019, Li-Ning announced that it would not do business with the Houston Rockets after the NBA team's then-general manager Daryl Morey tweeted in support of the 2019–20 Hong Kong protests. Also, Li-Ning along with Sunlight Sports Pvt. Ltd. (representative and distributor of Li-Ning in India) signed sponsorship deals with Indian badminton players P V Sindhu and Kidambi Srikanth.

On 1 June 2026, Stephen Curry announced that he had entered into a partnership with Li-Ning. ESPN subsequently reported that the agreement was worth $400 million over ten years and covered basketball products, athleisure, and a full golf line, while allowing Curry to sign athletes under his brand.

=== Olympic Committees ===
- (Argentina) Argentine Olympic Committee
- (Indonesia) Indonesian Olympic Committee
- (Mexico) Mexican Olympic Committee

=== Basketball ===
==== Club teams ====
- (China) Beijing Ducks
- (China) Guangdong Southern Tigers
- (China) Shanghai Sharks
- (China) Zhejiang Lions
- (Malaysia) Kuala Lumpur Dragons
- (Mexico) Capitanes de la Ciudad de México

==== Players ====
- (United States) Cleanthony Early
- (United States) Glenn Robinson III
- (United States) Frank Mason III
- (United States) CJ McCollum
- (United States) D'Angelo Russell
- (United States) Jimmy Butler
- (United States) Udonis Haslem
- (United States) Dwyane Wade
- (United States) Fred VanVleet
- (United States) R. J. Hampton
- (United States) Stephen Curry

=== Football ===
==== National teams ====
- Indonesia (Asian Games and Sea Games only)

==== Club teams ====
- (China) Beijing BIT
- (China) Hunan Billows
- (Malaysia) Kuala Lumpur City F.C.
- (Nepal) Birgunj United FC
- (Nepal) F.C. Chitwan
- (Nepal) Jawalakhel YC
- (Nepal) Kathmandu Rayzrs F.C.
- (Vietnam) The Cong – Viettel FC

=== Tennis ===
- Tajikistan Fed Cup team

=== Badminton ===
==== Male players ====
- (China) Chen Long
- (Denmark) Kim Astrup
- (Denmark) Mathias Christiansen
- (Denmark) Anders Skaarup Rasmussen
- (India) Srikanth Kidambi
- (Japan) Yuta Watanabe
- (Malaysia) Ong Yew Sin
- (Malaysia) Teo Ee Yi
- (Singapore) Loh Kean Yew

==== Female players ====
- (Denmark) Alexandra Bøje
- (India) P. V. Sindhu
- (Indonesia) Gregoria Mariska Tunjung
- (Malaysia) Goh Jin Wei
- (Singapore) Yeo Jia Min
- (Thailand) Pornpawee Chochuwong
- (Japan) Chiharu Shida

=== Winter sports athletes ===
- (Canada) Max Parrot

=== Olympic Committees ===
- (India) Indian Olympic Committee

==== Basketball players ====
- (United States) Baron Davis
- (United States) Shaquille O'Neal
- (United States) Damon Jones
- (Spain) José Calderón
- (United States) Evan Turner

==== Football clubs ====
- (Spain) Espanyol (2010-2012)
- (Spain) Celta de Vigo (2010-2013)
- (Spain) Málaga (2010-2011)
- (Spain) Sevilla (2011-2012)
- (Iran) Tractor SC (2017-2018)
- (Iran) Persepolis (2018-2019)
- (Iran) Esteghlal Khuzestan
- (Mexico) Puebla (2018-2019)
- (North Macedonia) Vardar (2008-2012)
- (Tajikistan) Istiklol (2010-2012)
- (Vietnam) Phu Dong (2019-2022)

==== National football teams ====
- Tajikistan

==== Badminton players ====
- (China) Lin Dan
- (Indonesia) Dejan Ferdinansyah
- (Indonesia) Gloria Emanuelle Widjaja
- (Malaysia) Goh Liu Ying

== Environmental practices ==
In July 2011, Li-Ning, along with other major sportswear and fashion brands including Nike, Adidas and Abercrombie & Fitch, was the subject of a report by the environmental group Greenpeace entitled 'Dirty Laundry'. Li-Ning, along with Abercrombie & Fitch, Adidas, Bauer Hockey, Calvin Klein, Converse, Cortefiel, H&M, Lacoste, Nike, Phillips-Van Heusen Corporation (PVH Corp) and Puma, were accused of working with suppliers in China who, according to the findings of the report, contribute to the pollution of the Yangtze and Pearl Rivers. Samples taken from one facility belonging to the Youngor Group located on the Yangtze River Delta and another belonging to the Well Dyeing Factory Ltd. located on a tributary of the Pearl River Delta revealed the presence of hazardous and persistent hormone disruptor chemicals, including alkylphenols, perfluorinated compounds and perfluorooctane sulfonate.
