= Curry Brand =

Sub-brand of Under Armour in partnership with Stephen Curry

- Industry: Sportswear, Footwear
- Founded: November 30, 2020; 5 years ago
- Founder: Under Armour and Stephen Curry
- Products: Footwear, Apparel, Accessories
- Parent: Li-Ning (2026-); Under Armour (2020–2025)
- Website: www.underarmour.com/en-us/t/currybrand/

Curry Brand is a brand launched by NBA star Stephen Curry in November 2020. The brand was a sub-brand of Under Armour, until their partnership ended in November 2025. In June 2026, Curry Brand entered into a 10-year partnership with Chinese sportswear company Li-Ning, expanding into basketball products, athleisure, athlete endorsements, and golf equipment. The brand focuses on basketball performance footwear, apparel, and accessories. Curry Brand is positioned as a competitor to Nike's Jordan Brand.

== History ==
Curry Brand was officially announced by Under Armour on November 30, 2020, as part of a long-term partnership with Stephen Curry. The launch coincided with Under Armour's quarterly earnings report, which revealed $1.43 billion in revenue, flat compared to the previous year.

After a 12-year partnership between Stephen Curry and Under Armour, in November 2025, the two agreed to part ways with Curry maintaining sole ownership of the brand and being free to find another retail partner.

In June 2026, Curry Brand entered into a long-term partnership with Chinese sportswear company Li-Ning. The agreement included basketball footwear and apparel, athleisure products, a golf line, and the ability for Stephen Curry to sign athletes under the Curry Brand banner. The partnership was reported as a 10-year deal by ESPN.

=== Collaborations ===
Curry Brand has collaborated with many brands and artists, including celebrities Dave Chappelle and the Bruce Lee estate.

Curry Brand has worked with streetwear brands and fashion houses, including fellow UA alumni and professional basketball player Brandon Jennings and his brand Tuff Crowd, and Stone Island. In 2021, Curry Brand announced a partnership with Sesame Street to produce a seven-piece sneaker collection, called “Street Pack,” with different character-inspired versions of the Curry Flow 9.

== Logo ==
The "Splash" logo is the result of a collaboration between David Bond, former head of the Curry Brand, and Stanley Hainsworth, Tether Agency. This is the same Seattle-based company that Curry collaborated with to work on the signature campaign launches for the Curry 4. The logo draws together Curry's initials ‘S’ and ‘C,’ in combination with the number ‘3’ identical to a hand gesture to symbolize Curry's ability to shoot the 3. Also, there's the "high wing" that is, as Curry says, is a "higher arc" which also resembles a halo drawing inspiration from Curry's faith.

== Product line ==
The product line includes basketball shoes.

=== Models ===
Model	Year	Notes
Curry 1	2015	
Curry 2	2015	
Curry 2.5	2016	
Curry 3	2016	
Curry 3Zer0	2017	
Curry 4	2017	Curry revealed the Curry 4 in the NBA Finals. The Curry 4 received limited releases throughout October 2017, but were available globally October 27, 2017. The Curry 4s are one of Curry's favorites in the series. Similarly to Curry, many thought that the Curry 4s looked like one of the best Curry signatures to date.
Curry 3Zer0 2	2018	
Curry 5	2018	
Curry 6	2019	
Curry 7	2019	The Curry 7 was released November 1, 2019. The Curry 7s are one of Curry's favorites in the series.
Curry 8	2020	Labelled "Curry 'Flow' 8", this shoe is the first sneaker to be launched under the Curry Brand. Fred Dojan, Innovation VP of Footwear Development at Under Armour helped with design and development. During its three years of development, it was a collaboration between UA and Dow, which helped deliver UA’s proprietary "UA HOVR" cushioning. The shoe was released December 11, 2020. The Curry 8s are one of Curry's favorites in the series.
Curry 3Z5	2021	
Curry 9	2022	
Curry 10	2022	
Curry 11	2023	The Curry 11 was initially teased at Curry's basketball camp in August 2023 and was released October 13, 2023, with the initial color way being called "Future Curry."
Curry 12	2024	The Curry 12 was released in August 2024.
Curry 13	2026	The Curry 13 was released on February 13, 2026, as the final signature shoe released under Curry Brand’s partnership with Under Armour.

== Reception ==
The launch of Curry Brand was met with significant media attention, with many drawing comparisons to Nike's Jordan Brand. Analysts noted that the partnership with Stephen Curry could help Under Armour strengthen its position in the competitive sportswear market, particularly in the basketball category. However, some critics questioned whether Curry Brand could achieve the same level of cultural and commercial success as Jordan Brand, given the latter's decades-long dominance.

== Sponsorships ==
=== Basketball ===
From the Curry Brand Official Press Releases:

- De'Aaron Fox (October 2023 – present)
- MiLaysia Fulwiley (March 2024 – present)
- Keisei Tominaga (June 2024 – present)
- Davion Mitchell (February 2025 – present)
- Jacob Zhu (June 2025 – present)

== See also ==
- Under Armour
- Stephen Curry
- Jordan Brand
- Eat. Learn. Play. Foundation
