= Golf Coaches Association of America =

The Golf Coaches Association of America (GCAA) is a non-profit organization that is a professional association of men's collegiate golf coaches. It was founded in 1958, and is located on 1225 West Main Street in Norman, Oklahoma.

The GCAA has over 750 members, representing the three NCAA divisions, NAIA, and NJCAA.

== Hall of fame ==
The GCAA Hall of Fame began in 1980, for outstanding college golf coaches. Starting in 1985, the Hall of Fame presents each year the GCAA's highest coaching award, the Honor Award, to a living member of the Hall of Fame.
